= Translation plane =

Special type of projective plane

In mathematics, a translation plane is a projective plane which admits a certain group of symmetries (described below). Along with the Hughes planes and the Figueroa planes, translation planes are among the most well-studied of the known non-Desarguesian planes, and the vast majority of known non-Desarguesian planes are either translation planes, or can be obtained from a translation plane via successive iterations of dualization and/or derivation.

In a projective plane, let P represent a point, and l represent a line. A central collineation with center P and axis l is a collineation fixing every point on l and every line through P. It is called an elation if P is on l, otherwise it is called a homology. The central collineations with center P and axis l form a group. A line l in a projective plane Π is a translation line if the group of all elations with axis l acts transitively on the points of the affine plane obtained by removing l from the plane Π, Π_{l} (the affine derivative of Π). A projective plane with a translation line is called a translation plane.

The affine plane obtained by removing the translation line is called an affine translation plane. While it is often easier to work with projective planes, in this context several authors use the term translation plane to mean affine translation plane.

== Algebraic construction with coordinates ==
Every projective plane can be coordinatized by at least one planar ternary ring. For translation planes, it is always possible to coordinatize with a quasifield. However, some quasifields satisfy additional algebraic properties, and the corresponding planar ternary rings coordinatize translation planes which admit additional symmetries. Some of these special classes are:

- Nearfield planes - coordinatized by nearfields.
- Semifield planes - coordinatized by semifields, semifield planes have the property that their dual is also a translation plane.
- Moufang planes - coordinatized by alternative division rings, Moufang planes are exactly those translation planes that have at least two translation lines. Every finite Moufang plane is Desarguesian and every Desarguesian plane is a Moufang plane, but there are infinite Moufang planes that are not Desarguesian (such as the Cayley plane).

Given a quasifield with operations + (addition) and $\cdot$ (multiplication), one can define a planar ternary ring to create coordinates for a translation plane. However, it is more typical to create an affine plane directly from the quasifield by defining the points as pairs $(a,b)$ where $a$ and $b$ are elements of the quasifield, and the lines are the sets of points $(x,y)$ satisfying an equation of the form $y = m \cdot x + b$ , as $m$ and $b$ vary over the elements of the quasifield, together with the sets of points $(x,y)$ satisfying an equation of the form $x=a$ , as $a$ varies over the elements of the quasifield.

== Geometric construction with spreads (Bruck/Bose) ==
Translation planes are related to spreads of odd-dimensional projective spaces by the Bruck-Bose construction. A spread of PG(2n+1, K), where $n \geq 1$ is an integer and K a division ring, is a partition of the space into pairwise disjoint n-dimensional subspaces. In the finite case, a spread of PG(2n+1, q) is a set of q^{n+1} + 1 n-dimensional subspaces, with no two intersecting.

Given a spread S of PG(2n +1, K), the Bruck-Bose construction produces a translation plane as follows: Embed PG(2n+1, K) as a hyperplane $\Sigma$ of PG(2n+2, K). Define an incidence structure A(S) with "points," the points of PG(2n+2, K) not on $\Sigma$ and "lines" the (n+1)-dimensional subspaces of PG(2n+2, K) meeting $\Sigma$ in an element of S. Then A(S) is an affine translation plane. In the finite case, this procedure produces a translation plane of order q^{n+1}.

The converse of this statement is almost always true. Any translation plane which is coordinatized by a quasifield that is finite-dimensional over its kernel K (K is necessarily a division ring) can be generated from a spread of PG(2n+1, K) using the Bruck-Bose construction, where (n+1) is the dimension of the quasifield, considered as a module over its kernel. An instant corollary of this result is that every finite translation plane can be obtained from this construction.

== Algebraic construction with spreads (André) ==
André gave an earlier algebraic representation of (affine) translation planes that is fundamentally the same as Bruck/Bose. Let V be a 2n-dimensional vector space over a field F. A spread of V is a set S of n-dimensional subspaces of V that partition the non-zero vectors of V. The members of S are called the components of the spread and if V_{i} and V_{j} are distinct components then V_{i} ⊕ V_{j} = V. Let A be the incidence structure whose points are the vectors of V and whose lines are the cosets of components, that is, sets of the form v + U where v is a vector of V and U is a component of the spread S. Then:

A is an affine plane and the group of translations x → x + w for w in V is an automorphism group acting regularly on the points of this plane.

=== The finite case ===
Let F = GF(q) = F_{q}, the finite field of order q and V the 2n-dimensional vector space over F represented as:

$$V = \{ (x,y) \colon x, y \in F^n \}.$$

Let M_{0}, M_{1}, ..., M_{q^{n} - 1} be n × n matrices over F with the property that M_{i} – M_{j} is nonsingular whenever i ≠ j. For i = 0, 1, ...,q^{n} – 1 define,

$$V_i = \{(x, xM_i) \colon x \in F^n \},$$

usually referred to as the subspaces "y = xM_{i}". Also define:

$$V_{q^n} = \{ (0,y) \colon y \in F^n \},$$

the subspace "x = 0".

The set {V_{0}, V_{1}, ..., V_{q^{n}}} is a spread of V.

The set of matrices M_{i} used in this construction is called a spread set, and this set of matrices can be used directly in the projective space $PG(2n-1,q)$ to create a spread in the geometric sense.

== Reguli and regular spreads ==
Let $\Sigma$ be the projective space PG(2n+1, K) for $n \geq 1$ an integer, and K a division ring. A regulus R in $\Sigma$ is a collection of pairwise disjoint n-dimensional subspaces with the following properties:

1. R contains at least 3 elements
2. Every line meeting three elements of R, called a transversal, meets every element of R
3. Every point of a transversal to R lies on some element of R

Any three pairwise disjoint n-dimensional subspaces in $\Sigma$ lie in a unique regulus. A spread S of $\Sigma$ is regular if for any three distinct n-dimensional subspaces of S, all the members of the unique regulus determined by them are contained in S. For any division ring K with more than 2 elements, if a spread S of PG(2n+1, K) is regular, then the translation plane created by that spread via the André/Bruck-Bose construction is a Moufang plane. A slightly weaker converse holds: if a translation plane is Pappian, then it can be generated via the André/Bruck-Bose construction from a regular spread.

In the finite case, K must be a field of order $q > 2$, and the classes of Moufang, Desarguesian and Pappian planes are all identical, so this theorem can be refined to state that a spread S of PG(2n+1, q) is regular if and only if the translation plane created by that spread via the André/Bruck-Bose construction is Desarguesian.

In the case where K is the field $GF(2)$, all spreads of PG(2n+1, 2) are trivially regular, since a regulus only contains three elements. While the only translation plane of order 8 is Desarguesian, there are known to be non-Desarguesian translation planes of order 2^{e} for every integer $e \geq 4$.

== Families of non-Desarguesian translation planes ==
- Hall planes - constructed via Bruck/Bose from a regular spread of $PG(3,q)$ where one regulus has been replaced by the set of transversal lines to that regulus (called the opposite regulus).
- Subregular planes - constructed via Bruck/Bose from a regular spread of $PG(3,q)$ where a set of pairwise disjoint reguli have been replaced by their opposite reguli.
- André planes
- Nearfield planes
- Semifield planes

== Finite translation planes of small order ==
It is well known that the only projective planes of order 8 or less are Desarguesian, and there are no known non-Desarguesian planes of prime order. Finite translation planes must have prime power order. There are four projective planes of order 9, of which two are translation planes: the Desarguesian plane, and the Hall plane. The following table details the current state of knowledge:

Order	Number of Non-Desarguesian Translation Planes
9	1
16	7
25	20
27	6
32	≥8
49	1346
64	≥2833
