= Smooth projective plane =

In geometry, smooth projective planes are special projective planes. The most prominent example of a smooth projective plane is the real projective plane ${\mathcal E}$. Its geometric operations of joining two distinct points by a line and of intersecting two lines in a point are not only continuous but even smooth (infinitely differentiable $= C^\infty$). Similarly, the classical planes over the complex numbers, the quaternions, and the octonions are smooth planes. However, these are not the only such planes.

== Definition and basic properties ==
A smooth projective plane ${\mathcal P} = (P,\mathfrak{L})$ consists of a point space $P$ and a line space $\mathfrak{L}$ that are smooth manifolds and where both geometric operations of joining and intersecting are smooth.

The geometric operations of smooth planes are continuous; hence, each smooth plane is a compact topological plane. Smooth planes exist only with point spaces of dimension 2^{m} where $1\le m\le 4$, because this is true for compact connected projective topological planes. These four cases will be treated separately below.

Theorem. The point manifold of a smooth projective plane is homeomorphic to its classical counterpart, and so is the line manifold.

== Automorphisms ==
Automorphisms play a crucial role in the study of smooth planes. A bijection of the point set of a projective plane is called a collineation, if it maps lines onto lines. The continuous collineations of a compact projective plane ${\mathcal P}$ form the group $\operatorname{Aut}{\mathcal P}$. This group is taken with the topology of uniform convergence. We have:

Theorem. If ${\mathcal P} = (P,\mathfrak{L})$ is a smooth plane, then each continuous collineation of ${\mathcal P}$ is smooth; in other words, the group of automorphisms of a smooth plane ${\mathcal P}$ coincides with $\operatorname{Aut}{\mathcal P}$. Moreover, $\operatorname{Aut}{\mathcal P}$ is a smooth Lie transformation group of $P$ and of $\mathfrak{L}$.

The automorphism groups of the four classical planes are simple Lie groups of dimension 8, 16, 35, or 78, respectively. All other smooth planes have much smaller groups. See below.

== Translation planes ==
A projective plane is called a translation plane if its automorphism group has a subgroup that fixes each point on some line $W$ and acts sharply transitively on the set of points not on $W$.

Theorem. Every smooth projective translation plane ${\mathcal P}$ is isomorphic to one of the four classical planes.

This shows that there are many compact connected topological projective planes that are not smooth. On the other hand, the following construction yields real analytic non-Desarguesian planes of dimension 2, 4, and 8, with a compact group of automorphisms of dimension 1, 4, and 13, respectively: represent points and lines in the usual way by homogeneous coordinates over the real or complex numbers or the quaternions, say, by vectors of length $1$. Then the incidence of the point $(x,y,z)$ and the line $(a,b,c)$ is defined by $ax+by+cz=t |c|^2|z|^2cz$, where $t$ is a fixed real parameter such that $|t|<1/9$. These planes are self-dual.

== 2-dimensional planes ==
Compact 2-dimensional projective planes can be described in the following way: the point space is a compact surface $S$, each line is a Jordan curve in $S$ (a closed subset homeomorphic to the circle), and any two distinct points are joined by a unique line. Then $S$ is homeomorphic to the point space of the real plane ${\mathcal E}$, any two distinct lines intersect in a unique point, and the geometric operations are continuous (apply Salzmann et al. 1995, §31 to the complement of a line). A familiar family of examples was given by Moulton in 1902. These planes are characterized by the fact that they have a 4-dimensional automorphism group. They are not isomorphic to a smooth plane. More generally, all non-classical compact 2-dimensional planes ${\mathcal P}$ such that $\dim\operatorname{Aut}{\mathcal P} \ge 3$ are known explicitly; none of these is smooth:

Theorem. If ${\mathcal P}$ is a smooth 2-dimensional plane and if $\dim\operatorname{Aut}{\mathcal P} \ge 3$, then ${\mathcal P}$ is the classical real plane ${\mathcal E}$.

== 4-dimensional planes ==
All compact planes ${\mathcal P}$ with a 4-dimensional point space and $\operatorname{Aut}{\mathcal P} \ge 7$ have been classified. Up to duality, they are either translation planes or they are isomorphic to a unique so-called shift plane. According to Bödi (1996, Chap. 10), this shift plane is not smooth. Hence, the result on translation planes implies:

Theorem. A smooth 4-dimensional plane is isomorphic to the classical complex plane, or $\dim\operatorname{Aut}{\mathcal P}\le 6$.

== 8-dimensional planes ==
Compact 8-dimensional topological planes ${\mathcal P}$ have been discussed in Salzmann et al. (1995, Chapter 8) and, more recently, in Salzmann (2014). Put $\Sigma = \operatorname{Aut}{\mathcal P}$. Either ${\mathcal P}$ is the classical quaternion plane or $\dim\Sigma \le 18$. If $\dim\Sigma \ge 17$, then ${\mathcal P}$ is a translation plane, or a dual translation plane, or a Hughes plane. The latter can be characterized as follows: $\Sigma$ leaves some classical complex subplane ${\mathcal C}$ invariant and induces on ${\mathcal C}$ the connected component of its full automorphism group. The Hughes planes are not smooth. This yields a result similar to the case of 4-dimensional planes:

Theorem. If ${\mathcal P}$ is a smooth 8-dimensional plane, then ${\mathcal P}$ is the classical quaternion plane or $\dim\Sigma \le 16$.

== 16-dimensional planes ==
Let $\Sigma$ denote the automorphism group of a compact 16-dimensional topological projective plane ${\mathcal P}$. Either ${\mathcal P}$ is the smooth classical octonion plane or $\dim\Sigma\le 40$. If $\dim\Sigma = 40$, then $\Sigma$ fixes a line $W$ and a point $v\in W$, and the affine plane ${\mathcal P}\smallsetminus W$ and its dual are translation planes. If $\dim\Sigma = 39$, then $\Sigma$ also fixes an incident point-line pair, but neither ${\mathcal P}$ nor $\Sigma$ are known explicitly. Nevertheless, none of these planes can be smooth:

Theorem. If ${\mathcal P}$ is a 16-dimensional smooth projective plane, then ${\mathcal P}$ is the classical octonion plane or $\dim\Sigma \le 38$.

== Main theorem ==
The last four results combine to give the following theorem:

If $c_m$ is the largest value of $\dim\operatorname{Aut}{\mathcal P}$, where ${\mathcal P}$ is a non-classical compact 2^{m}-dimensional topological projective plane, then $\dim\operatorname{Aut}{\mathcal P} \le c_m-2$ whenever ${\mathcal P}$ is even smooth.

== Complex analytic planes ==
The condition, that the geometric operations of a projective plane are complex analytic, is very restrictive. In fact, it is satisfied only in the classical complex plane.

Theorem. Every complex analytic projective plane is isomorphic as an analytic plane to the complex plane with its standard analytic structure.
