= Unital (geometry) =

Set of n^3 + 1 points arranged into subsets of n + 1

In geometry, a unital is a set of $n^3+1$ points arranged into subsets of size n + 1 so that every pair of distinct points of the set are contained in exactly one subset. (Note: Some authors, such as Barwick & Ebert 2008, p. 28, further require that n ≥ 3 to avoid small exceptional cases.) This is equivalent to saying that a unital is a 2-(n^{3} + 1, n + 1, 1) block design. Some unitals may be embedded in a projective plane of order n^{2} (the subsets of the design become sets of collinear points in the projective plane). In this case of embedded unitals, every line of the plane intersects the unital in either 1 or n + 1 points. In the Desarguesian planes, PG(2,q^{2}), the classical examples of unitals are given by nondegenerate Hermitian curves. There are also many non-classical examples. The first and the only known unital with non prime power parameters, n=6, was constructed by Bhaskar Bagchi and Sunanda Bagchi. It is still unknown if this unital can be embedded in a projective plane of order 36, if such a plane exists.

== Unitals ==
=== Classical ===
A correlation of a projective geometry is a bijection on its subspaces that reverses containment. In particular, a correlation interchanges points and hyperplanes.

A correlation of order two is called a polarity.

A polarity is called a unitary polarity if its associated sesquilinear form s with companion automorphism α satisfies

s(u,v) = s(v,u)^{α} for all vectors u, v of the underlying vector space.

A point is called an absolute point of a polarity if it lies on the image of itself under the polarity.

The absolute points of a unitary polarity of the projective geometry PG(d,F), for some d ≥ 2, is a nondegenerate Hermitian variety, and if d = 2 this variety is called a nondegenerate Hermitian curve.

In PG(2,q^{2}) for some prime power q, the set of points of a nondegenerate Hermitian curve form a unital, which is called a classical unital.

Let $\mathcal{H} = \mathcal{H}(2,q^2)$ be a nondegenerate Hermitian curve in $PG(2,q^2)$ for some prime power $q$. As all nondegenerate Hermitian curves in the same plane are projectively equivalent, $\mathcal{H}$ can be described in terms of homogeneous coordinates as follows:
$$\mathcal{H} = \{(x_0, x_1, x_2)\colon x_0^{q+1} + x_1^{q+1} + x_2^{q+1} = 0 \}.$$

=== Ree unitals ===
Another family of unitals based on Ree groups was constructed by H. Lüneburg. Let Γ = R(q) be the Ree group of type ^{2}G_{2} of order (q^{3} + 1)q^{3}(q − 1) where q = 3^{2m+1}. Let P be the set of all q^{3} + 1 Sylow 3-subgroups of Γ. Γ acts doubly transitively on this set by conjugation (it will be convenient to think of these subgroups as points that Γ is acting on.) For any S and T in P, the pointwise stabilizer, Γ_{S,T} is cyclic of order q - 1, and thus contains a unique involution, μ. Each such involution fixes exactly q + 1 points of P. Construct a block design on the points of P whose blocks are the fixed point sets of these various involutions μ. Since Γ acts doubly transitively on P, this will be a 2-design with parameters 2-(q^{3} + 1, q + 1, 1) called a Ree unital.

Lüneburg also showed that the Ree unitals can not be embedded in projective planes of order q^{2} (Desarguesian or not) such that the automorphism group Γ is induced by a collineation group of the plane. For q = 3, Grüning proved that a Ree unital can not be embedded in any projective plane of order 9.

=== Unitals with n = 3 ===
In the four projective planes of order 9 (the Desarguesian plane PG(2,9), the Hall plane of order 9, the dual Hall plane of order 9 and the Hughes plane of order 9. (Note: PG(2,9) and the Hughes plane are both self-dual.)), an exhaustive computer search by Penttila and Royle found 18 unitals (up to equivalence) with n = 3 in these four planes: two in PG(2,9) (both Buekenhout), four in the Hall plane (two Buekenhout, two not), and so another four in the dual Hall plane, and eight in the Hughes plane. However, one of the Buekenhout unitals in the Hall plane is self-dual, and thus gets counted again in the dual Hall plane. Thus, there are 17 distinct embeddable unitals with n = 3. On the other hand, a nonexhaustive computer search found over 900 mutually nonisomorphic designs which are unitals with n = 3.

=== Isomorphic versus equivalent unitals ===
Since unitals are block designs, two unitals are said to be isomorphic if there is a design isomorphism between them, that is, a bijection between the point sets which maps blocks to blocks. This concept does not take into account the property of embeddability, so to do so we say that two unitals, embedded in the same ambient plane, are equivalent if there is a collineation of the plane which maps one unital to the other.

== Buekenhout's Constructions ==
By examining the classical unital in $PG(2,q^2)$ in the Bruck/Bose model, Buekenhout provided two constructions, which together proved the existence of an embedded unital in any finite 2-dimensional translation plane. Metz subsequently showed that one of Buekenhout's constructions actually yields non-classical unitals in all finite Desarguesian planes of square order at least 9. These Buekenhout-Metz unitals have been extensively studied.

The core idea in Buekenhout's construction is that when one looks at $PG(2,q^2)$ in the higher-dimensional Bruck/Bose model, which lies in $PG(4,q)$, the equation of the Hermitian curve satisfied by a classical unital becomes a quadric surface in $PG(4,q)$, either a point-cone over a 3-dimensional ovoid if the line represented by the spread of the Bruck/Bose model meets the unital in one point, or a non-singular quadric otherwise. Because these objects have known intersection patterns with respect to planes of $PG(4,q)$, the resulting point set remains a unital in any translation plane whose generating spread contains all of the same lines as the original spread within the quadric surface. In the ovoidal cone case, this forced intersection consists of a single line, and any spread can be mapped onto a spread containing this line, showing that every translation plane of this form admits an embedded unital.

== Hermitian varieties ==
Hermitian varieties are in a sense a generalisation of quadrics, and occur naturally in the theory of polarities.

=== Definition ===
Let K be a field with an involutive automorphism $\theta$. Let n be an integer $\geq 1$ and V be an (n+1)-dimensional vector space over K.

A Hermitian variety H in PG(V) is a set of points of which the representing vector lines consisting of isotropic points of a non-trivial Hermitian sesquilinear form on V.

=== Representation ===
Let $e_0,e_1,\ldots,e_n$ be a basis of V. If a point p in the projective space has homogeneous coordinates $(X_0,\ldots,X_n)$ with respect to this basis, it is on the Hermitian variety if and only if :

$\sum_{i,j = 0}^{n} a_{ij} X_{i} X_{j}^{\theta} =0$

where $a_{i j}=a_{j i}^{\theta}$ and not all $a_{ij}=0$

If one constructs the Hermitian matrix A with $A_{i j}=a_{i j}$, the equation can be written in a compact way :

$X^t A X^{\theta}=0$

where
$$X= \begin{bmatrix} X_0 \\ X_1 \\ \vdots \\ X_n  \end{bmatrix}.$$

=== Tangent spaces and singularity ===
Let p be a point on the Hermitian variety H. A line L through p is by definition tangent when it is contains only one point (p itself) of the variety or lies completely on the variety. One can prove that these lines form a subspace, either a hyperplane of the full space. In the latter case, the point is singular.

== Sources ==
- Assmus, E. F. Jr; Key, J. D. (1992), Designs and Their Codes, Cambridge Tracts in Mathematics #103, Cambridge University Press, ISBN 0-521-41361-3
- Bagchi, S.; Bagchi, B. (1989), "Designs from pairs of finite fields. A cyclic unital U(6) and other regular steiner 2-designs", Journal of Combinatorial Theory, Series A, 52: 51–61, doi:10.1016/0097-3165(89)90061-7
- Barwick, Susan; Ebert, Gary (2008), Unitals in Projective Planes, Springer, doi:10.1007/978-0-387-76366-8, ISBN 978-0-387-76364-4
- Betten, A.; Betten, D.; Tonchev, V.D. (2003), "Unitals and codes", Discrete Mathematics, 267 (1–3): 23–33, doi:10.1016/s0012-365x(02)00600-3
- Dembowski, Peter (1968), Finite geometries, Ergebnisse der Mathematik und ihrer Grenzgebiete, Band 44, Berlin, New York: Springer-Verlag, ISBN 3-540-61786-8, MR 0233275 – via Internet Archive
- Grüning, K. (1986), "Das Kleinste Ree-Unital", Archiv der Mathematik, 46 (5): 473–480, doi:10.1007/bf01210788, S2CID 115302560
- Lüneburg, H. (1966), "Some remarks concerning the Ree group of type (G_{2})", Journal of Algebra, 3 (2): 256–259, doi:10.1016/0021-8693(66)90014-7
- Penttila, T.; Royle, G.F. (1995), "Sets of type (m,n) in the affine and projective planes of order nine", Designs, Codes and Cryptography, 6 (3): 229–245, doi:10.1007/bf01388477, S2CID 43638589
