= Spread (projective geometry) =

Well studied projective geometries over finite fields

A frequently studied problem in finite geometry is to identify ways in which an object can be covered by other simpler objects such as points, lines, and planes. In projective geometry, a specific instance of this problem that has numerous applications is determining whether, and how, a projective space can be covered by pairwise disjoint subspaces which have the same dimension; such a partition is called a spread. Specifically, a spread of a projective space $PG(d,K)$, where $d \geq 1$ is an integer and $K$ a division ring, is a set of $r$-dimensional subspaces, for some $0 < r < d$ such that every point of the space lies in exactly one of the elements of the spread.

Spreads are particularly well-studied in projective geometries over finite fields, though some notable results apply to infinite projective geometries as well. In the finite case, the foundational work on spreads appears in André and independently in Bruck-Bose in connection with the theory of translation planes. In these papers, it is shown that a spread of $r$-dimensional subspaces of the finite projective space $PG(d,q)$ exists if and only if $r+1 \mid d+1$.

== Spreads and translation planes ==
For all integers $n \geq 1$, the projective space $PG(2n+1,q)$ always has a spread of $n$-dimensional subspaces, and in this section the term spread refers to this specific type of spread; spreads of this form may (and frequently do) occur in infinite projective geometries as well. These spreads are the most widely studied in the literature, due to the fact that every such spread can be used to create a translation plane using the André/Bruck-Bose construction.

=== Reguli and regular spreads ===
Let $\Sigma$ be the projective space $PG(2n+1,K)$ for $n \geq 1$ an integer, and $K$ a division ring. A regulus $R$ in $\Sigma$ is a collection of pairwise disjoint $n$-dimensional subspaces with the following properties:

1. $R$ contains at least 3 elements
2. Every line meeting three elements of $R$, called a transversal, meets every element of $R$
3. Every point of a transversal to $R$ lies on some element of $R$

Any three pairwise disjoint $n$-dimensional subspaces in $\Sigma$ lie in a unique regulus. A spread $S$ of $\Sigma$ is regular if for any three distinct $n$-dimensional subspaces of $S$, all the members of the unique regulus determined by them are contained in $S$. Regular spreads are significant in the theory of translation planes, in that they generate Moufang planes in general, and Desarguesian planes in the finite case when the order of the ambient field is greater than $2$. All spreads of $PG(2n+1,2)$ are trivially regular, since a regulus only contains three elements.

=== Constructing a regular spread ===
Construction of a regular spread is most easily seen using an algebraic model. Letting $V$ be a $(2n+2)$-dimensional vector space over a field $F$, one can model the $k$-dimensional subspaces of $PG(2n+1,F)$ using the $(k+1)$-dimensional subspaces of $V$; this model uses homogeneous coordinates to represent points and hyperplanes. Incidence is defined by intersection, with subspaces intersecting in only the zero vector considered disjoint; in this model, the zero vector of $V$ is effectively ignored.

Let $F$ be a field and $E$ an $n$-dimensional extension field of $F$. Consider $V = E \oplus E$ as a $2n$-dimensional vector space over $F$, which provides a model for the projective space $PG(2n-1,F)$ as above. Each element of $V$ can be written uniquely as $(x,y)$ where $x,y \in E$. A regular spread is given by the set of $n$-dimensional projective spaces defined by $J(k) = \{(x,kx):x \in E\}$, for each $k \in E$, together with $J(\infty) = \{(0,y):y \in E\}$.

== Constructing spreads ==
=== Spread sets ===
The construction of a regular spread above is an instance of a more general construction of spreads, which uses the fact that field multiplication is a linear transformation over $E$ when considered as a vector space. Since $E$ is a finite $n$-dimensional extension over $F$, a linear transformation from $E$ to itself can be represented by an $n \times n$ matrix with entries in $F$. A spread set is a set $S$ of $n \times n$ matrices over $F$ with the following properties:

- $S$ contains the zero matrix and the identity matrix
- For any two distinct matrices $X$ and $Y$ in $S$, $X-Y$ is nonsingular
- For each pair of elements $a,b \in E$, there is a unique $X \in S$ such that $aX = b$

In the finite case, where $E$ is the field of order $q^n$ for some prime power $q$, the last condition is equivalent to the spread set containing $q^n$ matrices. Given a spread set $S$, one can create a spread as the set of $n$-dimensional projective spaces defined by $J(k) = \{(x,xM):x \in E\}$, for each $M \in S$, together with $J(\infty) = \{(0,y):y \in E\}$, As a specific example, the following nine matrices represent $GF(9)$ as 2 × 2 matrices over $GF(3)$ and so provide a spread set of $AG(2, 9)$.

$$\left [ \begin{matrix} 0 & 0 \\ 0 & 0 \end{matrix} \right ], \left [ \begin{matrix} 1 & 0 \\ 0 & 1 \end{matrix} \right ], \left [ \begin{matrix} 2 & 0 \\ 0 & 2 \end{matrix} \right ], \left [ \begin{matrix} 0 & 1 \\ 2 & 0 \end{matrix} \right ], \left [ \begin{matrix} 1 & 1 \\ 2 & 1 \end{matrix} \right ], \left [ \begin{matrix} 2 & 1 \\ 2 & 2 \end{matrix} \right ], \left [ \begin{matrix} 0 & 2 \\ 1 & 0 \end{matrix} \right ], \left [ \begin{matrix} 1 & 2 \\ 1 & 1\end{matrix} \right ], \left [ \begin{matrix} 2 & 2 \\ 2 & 1 \end{matrix} \right ]$$

Another example of a spread set yields the Hall plane of order 9

$$\left [ \begin{matrix} 0 & 0 \\ 0 & 0 \end{matrix} \right ], \left [ \begin{matrix} 1 & 0 \\ 0 & 1 \end{matrix} \right ], \left [ \begin{matrix} 2 & 0 \\ 0 & 2 \end{matrix} \right ], \left [ \begin{matrix} 1 & 1 \\ 1 & 2 \end{matrix} \right ], \left [ \begin{matrix} 2 & 2 \\ 2 & 1 \end{matrix} \right ], \left [ \begin{matrix} 0 & 1 \\ 2 & 0 \end{matrix} \right ], \left [ \begin{matrix} 0 & 2 \\ 1 & 0 \end{matrix} \right ], \left [ \begin{matrix} 1 & 2 \\ 2 & 2\end{matrix} \right ], \left [ \begin{matrix} 2 & 1 \\ 1 & 1 \end{matrix} \right ]$$

=== Modifying spreads ===
One common approach to creating new spreads is to start with a regular spread and modify it in some way. The techniques presented here are some of the more elementary examples of this approach.

==== Spreads of 3-space ====
One can create new spreads by starting with a spread and looking for a switching set, a subset of its elements that can be replaced with an alternate set of pairwise disjoint subspaces of the correct dimension. In $PG(3,K)$, a regulus forms a switching set, as the set of transversals of a regulus $R$ also form a regulus, called the opposite regulus of $R$. Removing the lines of a regulus in a spread and replacing them with the opposite regulus produces a new spread which is often non-isomorphic to the original. This process is a special case of a more general process called derivation or net replacement.

Starting with a regular spread of $PG(3,q)$ and reversing any regulus produces a spread that yields a Hall plane. In more generality, the process can be applied independently to any collection of reguli in a regular spread, yielding a subregular spread; the resulting translation plane is called a subregular plane. The André planes form a special subclass of subregular planes, of which the Hall planes are the simplest examples, arising by replacing a single regulus in a regular spread.

More complex switching sets have been constructed. Bruen has explored the concept of a chain of reguli in a regular spread of $PG(3,q)$, $q$ odd, namely a set of $(q+3)/2$ reguli which pairwise meet in exactly 2 lines, so that every line contained in a regulus of the chain is contained in exactly two distinct reguli of the chain. Bruen constructed an example of a chain in the regular spread of $PG(3,5)$, and showed that it could be replaced by taking the union of exactly half of the lines from the opposite regulus of each regulus in the chain. Numerous examples of Bruen chains have appeared in the literature since, and Heden has shown that any Bruen chain is replaceable using opposite half-reguli. Chains are known to exist in a regular spread of $PG(3,q)$ for all odd prime powers $q$ up to 37, except 29, and are known not to exist for $q \in \{29,41,43,47,49\}$. It is conjectured that no additional Bruen chains exist.

Baker and Ebert generalized the concept of a chain to a nest, which is a set of reguli in a regular spread such that every line contained in a regulus of the nest is contained in exactly two distinct reguli of the nest. Unlike a chain, two reguli in a nest are not required to meet in a pair of lines. Unlike chains, a nest in a regular spread need not be replaceable, however several infinite families of replaceable nests are known.

==== Higher-dimensional spreads ====
In higher dimensions a regulus cannot be reversed because the transversals do not have the correct dimension. There exist analogs to reguli, called norm surfaces, which can be reversed. The higher-dimensional André planes can be obtained from spreads obtained by reversing these norm surfaces, and there also exist analogs of subregular spreads which do not give rise to André planes.

=== Geometric techniques ===
There are several known ways to construct spreads of $PG(3,q)$ from other geometrical objects without reference to an initial regular spread. Some well-studied approaches to this are given below.

==== Flocks of quadratic cones ====
In $PG(3,q)$, a quadratic cone is the union of the set of lines containing a fixed point P (the vertex) and a point on a conic in a plane not passing through P. Since a conic has $q+1$ points, a quadratic cone has $q(q+1)+1$ points. As with traditional geometric conic sections, a plane of $PG(3,q)$ can meet a quadratic cone in either a point, a conic, a line or a line pair. A flock of a quadratic cone is a set of $q$ planes whose intersections with the quadratic cone are pairwise disjoint conics. The classic construction of a flock is to pick a line $m$ that does not meet the quadratic cone, and take the $q$ planes through $m$ that do not contain the vertex of the cone; such a flock is called linear.

Fisher and Thas show how to construct a spread of $PG(3,q)$ from a flock of a quadratic cone using the Klein correspondence, and show that the resulting spread is regular if and only if the initial flock is linear. Many infinite families of flocks of quadratic cones are known, as are numerous sporadic examples.

Every spread arising from a flock of a quadratic cone is the union of $q$ reguli which all meet in a fixed line $m$. Much like with a regular spread, any of these reguli can be replaced with its opposite to create several potentially new spreads.

==== Hyperbolic fibrations ====
In $PG(3,q)$ a hyperbolic fibration is a partition of the space into $q-1$ pairwise disjoint hyperbolic quadrics and two lines disjoint from all of the quadrics and each other. Since a hyperbolic quadric consists of the points covered by a regulus and its opposite, a hyperbolic fibration yields $2^{q-1}$ different spreads.

All spreads yielding André planes, including the regular spread, are obtainable from a hyperbolic fibration (specifically an algebraic pencil generated by any two of the quadrics), as articulated by André. Using nest replacement, Ebert found a family of spreads in which a hyperbolic fibration was identified. Baker, et al. provide an explicit example of a construction of a hyperbolic fibration. A much more robust source of hyperbolic fibrations was identified by Baker, et al., where the authors developed a correspondence between flocks of quadratic cones and hyperbolic fibrations; interestingly, the spreads generated by a flock of a quadratic cone are not generally isomorphic to the spreads generated from the corresponding hyperbolic fibration.

==== Subgeometry partitions ====
Hirschfeld and Thas note that for any odd integer $n \geq 3$, a partition of $PG(n-1,q^2)$ into subgeometries isomorphic to $PG(n-1,q)$ gives rise to a spread of $PG(2n-1,q)$, where each subgeometry of the partition corresponds to a regulus of the new spread.

The "classical" subgeometry partitions of $PG(n-1,q^2)$ can be generated using suborbits of a Singer cycle, but this simply generates a regular spread. Yff published the non-classical subgeometry partition, namely a partition of $PG(2,9)$ into 7 copies of $PG(2,3)$, that admit a cyclic group permuting the subplanes. Baker, et al. provide several infinite families of partitions of $PG(2,q^2)$ into subplanes, with the same cyclic group action.

== Partial spreads ==
A partial spread of a projective space $PG(d,K)$ is a set of pairwise disjoint $r$-dimensional subspaces in the space; hence a spread is just a partial spread where every point of the space is covered. A partial spread is called complete or maximal if there is no larger partial spread that contains it; equivalently, there is no $r$-dimensional subspace disjoint from all members of the partial spread. As with spreads, the most well-studied case is partial spreads of lines of the finite projective space $PG(3,q)$, where a full spread has size $q^2+1$. Mesner showed that any partial spread of lines in $PG(3,q)$ with size greater than $q^2 - \sqrt{q}$ cannot be complete; indeed, it must be a subset of a unique spread. For a lower bound, Bruen showed that a complete partial spread of lines in $PG(3,q)$ with size at most $q+\sqrt{q}$ lines cannot be complete; there will necessarily be a line that can be added to a partial spread of this size. Bruen also provides examples of complete partial spreads of lines in $PG(3,q)$ with sizes $q^2-q+1$ and $q^2-q+2$ for all $q > 2$.

== Spreads of classical polar spaces ==
The classical polar spaces are all embedded in some projective space $PG(d,K)$ as the set of totally isotropic subspaces of a sesquilinear or quadratic form on the vector space underlying the projective space. A particularly interesting class of partial spreads of $PG(d,K)$ are those that consist strictly of maximal subspaces of a classical polar space embedded in the projective space. Such partial spreads that cover all of the points of the polar space are called spreads of the polar space.

From the perspective of the theory of translation planes, the symplectic polar space is of particular interest, as its set of points are all of the points in $PG(2n+1,K)$, and its maximal subspaces are of dimension $n$. Hence a spread of the symplectic polar space is also a spread of the entire projective space, and can be used as noted above to create a translation plane. Several examples of symplectic spreads are known; see Ball, et al.
