= Non-Desarguesian plane =

Projective plane not satisfying Desargues' theorem

In mathematics, a non-Desarguesian plane is a projective plane (or sometimes an affine plane) that does not satisfy Desargues' theorem (named after Girard Desargues), or in other words a plane that is not a Desarguesian plane. The theorem of Desargues is true in all projective spaces of dimension not 2; in other words, the only projective spaces of dimension not equal to 2 are the classical projective geometries over a field (or division ring). However, David Hilbert found that some projective planes do not satisfy it. The current state of knowledge of these examples is not complete.

== Examples ==
There are many examples of both finite and infinite non-Desarguesian planes. Some of the known examples of infinite non-Desarguesian planes include:

- The Moulton plane.
- Moufang planes over alternative division algebras that are not associative, such as the projective plane over the octonions. Since all finite alternative division rings are fields (Artin–Zorn theorem), the only non-Desarguesian Moufang planes are infinite.

Regarding finite non-Desarguesian planes, every projective plane of order at most 8 is Desarguesian, but there are three non-Desarguesian examples of order 9, each with 91 points and 91 lines. They are:

- The Hughes plane of order 9.
- The Hall plane of order 9. Initially discovered by Veblen and Wedderburn, this plane was generalized to an infinite family of planes by Marshall Hall. Hall planes are a subclass of the more general André planes.
- The dual of the Hall plane of order 9.

Numerous other constructions of both finite and infinite non-Desarguesian planes are known, see for example Dembowski (1968). All known constructions of finite non-Desarguesian planes produce planes whose order is a proper prime power, that is, an integer of the form p^{e}, where p is a prime and e is an integer greater than 1.

== Classification ==
Hanfried Lenz gave a classification scheme for projective planes in 1954, which was refined by Adriano Barlotti in 1957. This classification scheme is based on the types of point–line transitivity permitted by the collineation group of the plane and is known as the Lenz–Barlotti classification of projective planes. The list of 53 types is given in Dembowski (1968, pp. 124–125) and a table of the then known existence results (for both collineation groups and planes having such a collineation group) in both the finite and infinite cases appears on page 126. As of 2007, "36 of them exist as finite groups. Between 7 and 12 exist as finite projective planes, and either 14 or 15 exist as infinite projective planes."

Other classification schemes exist. One of the simplest is based on special types of planar ternary ring (PTR) that can be used to coordinatize the projective plane. These types are fields, skewfields, alternative division rings, semifields, nearfields, right nearfields, quasifields and right quasifields.

== Conics and ovals ==
In a Desarguesian projective plane a conic can be defined in several different ways that can be proved to be equivalent. In non-Desarguesian planes these proofs are no longer valid and the different definitions can give rise to non-equivalent objects. Theodore G. Ostrom had suggested the name conicoid for these conic-like figures but did not provide a formal definition and the term does not seem to be widely used.

There are several ways that conics can be defined in Desarguesian planes:

1. The set of absolute points of a polarity is known as a von Staudt conic. If the plane is defined over a field of characteristic two, only degenerate conics are obtained.
2. The set of points of intersection of corresponding lines of two pencils which are projectively, but not perspectively, related is known as a Steiner conic. If the pencils are perspectively related, the conic is degenerate.
3. The set of points whose coordinates satisfy an irreducible homogeneous equation of degree two.

Furthermore, in a finite Desarguesian plane:

4. A set of q + 1 points, no three collinear in PG(2, q) is called an oval. If q is odd, by Segre's theorem, an oval in PG(2, q) is a conic, in sense 3 above.
5. An Ostrom conic is based on a generalization of harmonic sets.

Artzy has given an example of a Steiner conic in a Moufang plane which is not a von Staudt conic. Garner gives an example of a von Staudt conic that is not an Ostrom conic in a finite semifield plane.
