= Correlation (projective geometry) =

Concept in projective geometry

In projective geometry, a correlation is a transformation of a d-dimensional projective space that maps subspaces of dimension k to subspaces of dimension d − k − 1, reversing inclusion and preserving incidence. Correlations are also called reciprocities or reciprocal transformations.

== In two dimensions ==
In the real projective plane, points and lines are dual to each other. As expressed by Coxeter,

A correlation is a point-to-line and a line-to-point transformation that preserves the relation of incidence in accordance with the principle of duality. Thus it transforms ranges into pencils, pencils into ranges, [complete] quadrangles into [complete] quadrilaterals, and so on.

Given a line m and P a point not on m, an elementary correlation is obtained as follows: for every Q on m form the line PQ. The inverse correlation starts with the pencil on P: for any line q in this pencil take the point m ∩ q. The composition of two correlations that share the same pencil is a perspectivity.

== In three dimensions ==
In a 3-dimensional projective space a correlation maps a point to a plane. As stated in one textbook:

If κ is such a correlation, every point P is transformed by it into a plane π′ = κP, and conversely, every point P arises from a unique plane π′ by the inverse transformation κ^{−1}.

Three-dimensional correlations also transform lines into lines, so they may be considered to be collineations of the two spaces.

== In higher dimensions ==
In general n-dimensional projective space, a correlation takes a point to a hyperplane. This context was described by Paul Yale:

A correlation of the projective space P(V) is an inclusion-reversing permutation of the proper subspaces of P(V).

He proves a theorem stating that a correlation φ interchanges joins and intersections, and for any projective subspace W of P(V), the dimension of the image of W under φ is (n − 1) − dim W, where n is the dimension of the vector space V used to produce the projective space P(V).

== Existence of correlations ==
Correlations can exist only if the space is self-dual. For dimensions 3 and higher, self-duality is easy to test: A coordinatizing skewfield exists and self-duality fails if and only if the skewfield is not isomorphic to its opposite.

== Special types of correlations ==
=== Polarity ===
If a correlation φ is an involution (that is, two applications of the correlation equals the identity: φ^{2}(P) = P for all points P) then it is called a polarity. Polarities of projective spaces lead to polar spaces, which are defined by taking the collection of all subspace which are contained in their image under the polarity.

=== Natural correlation ===
There is a natural correlation induced between a projective space P(V) and its dual P(V^{∗}) by the natural pairing ⟨⋅,⋅⟩ between the underlying vector spaces V and its dual V^{∗}, where every subspace W of V^{∗} is mapped to its orthogonal complement W^{⊥} in V, defined as W^{⊥} = {v ∈ V | ⟨w, v⟩ = 0, ∀w ∈ W}.

Composing this natural correlation with an isomorphism of projective spaces induced by a semilinear map produces a correlation of P(V) to itself. In this way, every nondegenerate semilinear map V → V^{∗} induces a correlation of a projective space to itself.
