= Regulus (geometry) =

Surface in three-dimensional space

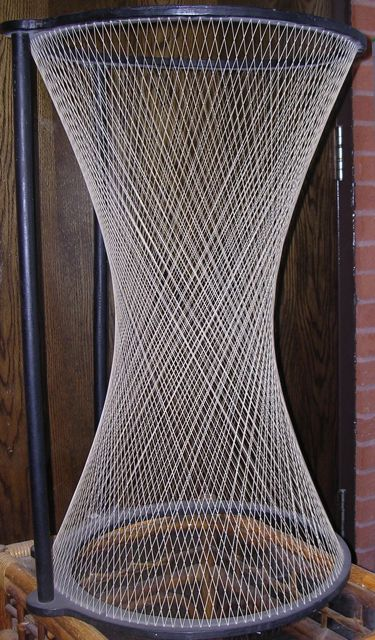
A string model of a portion of a regulus and its opposite to show the rules on a hyperboloid of one sheet

In three-dimensional space, a regulus R is a set of skew lines, every point of which is on a transversal which intersects an element of R only once, and such that every point on a transversal lies on a line of R.

The set of transversals of R forms an opposite regulus S. In $\mathbb{R}^{3}$ the union R ∪ S is the ruled surface of a hyperboloid of one sheet.

Any 3 skew lines generate a pair of reguli:

1. The set of lines that intersect all 3 of them sweeps out a quadratic surface. This ruling of this quadratic surface is the regulus.
2. The set of lines that intersect all lines in the regulus is the complementary regulus or associated regulus, by Gallucci's theorem.

Any 3 lines in a regulus generate the complementary regulus, and vice versa. The regulus surface is the unique quadratic surface that contains these 3 lines. The pair of reguli sweep out the same surface, showing that it is a doubly ruled surface.

According to Charlotte Scott, "The regulus supplies extremely simple proofs of the properties of a conic...the theorems of Chasles, Brianchon, and Pascal ..."

In a finite geometry PG(3, q), a regulus has q + 1 lines. For example, in 1954 William Edge described a pair of reguli of four lines each in PG(3,3).

Robert J. T. Bell described how the regulus is generated by a moving straight line. First, the hyperboloid $\frac{x^2}{a^2} + \frac{y^2}{b^2} - \frac{z^2}{c^2} \ = \ 1$ is factored as

$$\left(\frac{x}{a} + \frac{z}{c}\right) \left(\frac{x}{a} - \frac{z}{c}\right) \ =\  \left(1 + \frac{y}{b}\right) \left(1 - \frac{y}{b}\right) .$$

Then the following two systems of lines, parametrized by λ and μ satisfy that equation:

$\frac{x}{a} + \frac{z}{c} \ =\ \lambda \left(1 + \frac{y}{b}\right), \quad \frac{x}{a} - \frac{z}{c} \ =\ \frac{1}{\lambda} \left(1 - \frac{y}{b}\right)$ and
$$\frac{x}{a} - \frac{z}{c} \ =\ \mu \left(1 + \frac{y}{b}\right), \quad \frac{x}{a} + \frac{z}{c} \ =\ \frac{1}{\mu} \left(1 - \frac{y}{b}\right) .$$

No member of the first set of lines is a member of the second. As λ or μ varies, the hyperboloid is generated. The two sets represent a regulus and its opposite. Using analytic geometry, Bell proves that no two generators in a set intersect, and that any two generators in opposite reguli do intersect and form the plane tangent to the hyperboloid at that point. (page 155).

== See also ==
- Spread (projective geometry)
- Translation plane § Reguli and regular spreads
