= Projective frame =

In projective geometry, points that define coordinates

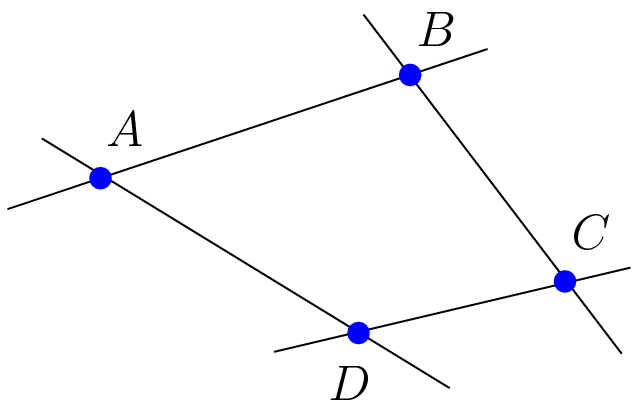
Projective plane: general position of 4 points

In mathematics, and more specifically in projective geometry, a projective frame or projective basis is a tuple of points in a projective space that can be used for defining homogeneous coordinates in this space. More precisely, in a projective space of dimension n, a projective frame is a n + 2-tuple of points such that no hyperplane contains n + 1 of them. A projective frame is sometimes called a simplex, although a simplex in a space of dimension n has at most n + 1 vertices.

In this article, only projective spaces over a field K are considered, although most results can be generalized to projective spaces over a division ring.

Let P(V) be a projective space of dimension n, where V is a K-vector space of dimension n + 1. Let $p:V\setminus\{0\}\to \mathbf P(V)$ be the canonical projection that maps a nonzero vector v to the corresponding point of P(V), which is the vector line that contains v.

Every frame of P(V) can be written as $\left(p(e_0), \ldots, p(e_{n+1})\right),$ for some vectors $e_0, \dots, e_{n+1}$ of V. The definition implies the existence of nonzero elements of K such that $\lambda_0e_0 + \cdots + \lambda_{n+1}e_{n+1}=0$. Replacing $e_i$ by $\lambda_ie_i$ for $i\le n$ and $e_{n+1}$ by $-\lambda_{n+1}e_{n+1}$, one gets the following characterization of a frame:

n + 2 points of P(V) form a frame if and only if they are the image by p of a basis of V and the sum of its elements.

Moreover, two bases define the same frame in this way, if and only if the elements of the second one are the products of the elements of the first one by a fixed nonzero element of K.

As homographies of P(V) are induced by linear endomorphisms of V, it follows that, given two frames, there is exactly one homography mapping the first one onto the second one. In particular, the only homography fixing the points of a frame is the identity map. This result is much more difficult in synthetic geometry (where projective spaces are defined through axioms). It is sometimes called the first fundamental theorem of projective geometry.

Every frame can be written as $(p(e_0), \ldots, p(e_n), p(e_0+\cdots+e_n)),$ where $(e_0, \dots, e_n)$ is basis of V. The projective coordinates or homogeneous coordinates of a point p(v) over this frame are the coordinates of the vector v on the basis $(e_0, \dots, e_n).$ If one changes the vectors representing the point p(v) and the frame elements, the coordinates are multiplied by a fixed nonzero scalar.

Commonly, the projective space P_{n}(K) = P(K^{n+1}) is considered. It has a canonical frame consisting of the image by p of the canonical basis of K^{n+1} (consisting of the elements having only one nonzero entry, which is equal to 1), and (1, 1, ..., 1). On this basis, the homogeneous coordinates of p(v) are simply the entries (coefficients) of v.

Given another projective space P(V) of the same dimension n, and a frame F of it, there is exactly one homography h mapping F onto the canonical frame of P(K^{n+1}). The projective coordinates of a point a on the frame F are the homogeneous coordinates of h(a) on the canonical frame of P_{n}(K).

In the case of a projective line, a frame consists of three distinct points. If P_{1}(K) is identified with K with a point at infinity ∞ added, then its canonical frame is (∞, 0, 1). Given any frame (a_{0}, a_{1}, a_{2}), the projective coordinates of a point a ≠ a_{0} are (r, 1), where r is the cross-ratio (a, a_{2}; a_{1}, a_{0}). If a = a_{0}, the cross ratio is the infinity, and the projective coordinates are (1,0).
