= Hall plane =

In mathematics, a Hall plane is a non-Desarguesian projective plane constructed by Marshall Hall Jr. (1943). There are examples of order p^{2n} for every prime p and every positive integer n provided p^{2n} > 4.

== Algebraic construction via Hall systems ==
The original construction of Hall planes was based on the Hall quasifield (also called a Hall system), H of order p^{2n} for p a prime. The creation of the plane from the quasifield follows the standard construction (see quasifield for details).

To build a Hall quasifield, start with a Galois field, F = GF(p^{n}) for p a prime and a quadratic irreducible polynomial f(x) = x^{2} − rx − s over F. Extend H = F × F, a two-dimensional vector space over F, to a quasifield by defining a multiplication on the vectors by (a, b) ∘ (c, d) = (ac − bd^{−1}f(c), ad − bc + br) when d ≠ 0 and (a, b) ∘ (c, 0) = (ac, bc) otherwise.

Writing the elements of H in terms of a basis ⟨1, λ⟩, that is, identifying (x, y) with x + λy as x and y vary over F, we can identify the elements of F as the ordered pairs (x, 0), i.e. x + λ0. The properties of the defined multiplication which turn the right vector space H into a quasifield are:

1. every element α of H not in F satisfies the quadratic equation f(α) = 0;
2. F is in the kernel of H (meaning that (α + β)c = αc + βc, and (αβ)c = α(βc) for all α, β in H and all c in F); and
3. every element of F commutes (multiplicatively) with all the elements of H.

== Derivation ==
Another construction that produces Hall planes is obtained by applying derivation to Desarguesian planes.

A process, due to T. G. Ostrom, which replaces certain sets of lines in a projective plane by alternate sets in such a way that the new structure is still a projective plane is called derivation. We give the details of this process. Start with a projective plane π of order n^{2} and designate one line ℓ as its line at infinity. Let A be the affine plane π ∖ ℓ. A set D of n + 1 points of ℓ is called a derivation set if for every pair of distinct points X and Y of A which determine a line meeting ℓ in a point of D, there is a Baer subplane containing X, Y and D (we say that such Baer subplanes belong to D.) Define a new affine plane D(A) as follows: The points of D(A) are the points of A. The lines of D(A) are the lines of π which do not meet ℓ at a point of D (restricted to A) and the Baer subplanes that belong to D (restricted to A). The set D(A) is an affine plane of order n^{2} and it, or its projective completion, is called a derived plane.

== Properties ==
1. Hall planes are translation planes.
2. All finite Hall planes of the same order are isomorphic.
3. Hall planes are not self-dual.
4. All finite Hall planes contain subplanes of order 2 (Fano subplanes).
5. All finite Hall planes contain subplanes of order different from 2.
6. Hall planes are André planes.

== Hall plane of order 9 ==
Hall plane of order 9
- Order: 9
- Lenz–Barlotti class: IVa.3
- Automorphisms: 2^{8} × 3^{5} × 5
- Point orbit lengths: 10, 81
- Line orbit lengths: 1, 90
- Properties: Translation plane

The Hall plane of order 9 is the smallest Hall plane, and one of the three smallest examples of a finite non-Desarguesian projective plane, along with its dual and the Hughes plane of order 9.

=== Construction ===
While usually constructed in the same way as other Hall planes, the Hall plane of order 9 was actually found earlier by Oswald Veblen and Joseph Wedderburn in 1907. There are four quasifields of order nine which can be used to construct the Hall plane of order nine. Three of these are Hall systems generated by the irreducible polynomials f(x) = x^{2} + 1, g(x) = x^{2} − x − 1 or h(x) = x^{2} + x − 1. The first of these produces an associative quasifield, that is, a near-field, and it was in this context that the plane was discovered by Veblen and Wedderburn. This plane is often referred to as the nearfield plane of order nine.

=== Properties ===
==== Automorphism Group ====
The Hall plane of order 9 is the unique projective plane, finite or infinite, which has Lenz–Barlotti class IVa.3. Its automorphism group acts on its (necessarily unique) translation line imprimitively, having 5 pairs of points that the group preserves set-wise; the automorphism group acts as S_{5} on these 5 pairs.

==== Unitals ====
The Hall plane of order 9 admits four inequivalent embedded unitals. Two of these unitals arise from Buekenhout's constructions: one is parabolic, meeting the translation line in a single point, while the other is hyperbolic, meeting the translation line in 4 points. The latter of these two unitals was shown by Grüning to also be embeddable in the dual Hall plane. Another of the unitals arises from the construction of Barlotti and Lunardon. The fourth has an automorphism group of order 8 isomorphic to the quaternions, and is not part of any known infinite family.
