= Quasifield =

Division ring with weakened conditions

In mathematics, a quasifield is an algebraic structure $(Q,+,\cdot)$ where $+$ and $\cdot$ are binary operations on $Q,$ much like a division ring, but with some weaker conditions. All division rings, and thus all fields, are quasifields.

== Definition ==
A quasifield $(Q,+,\cdot)$ is a structure, where $+$ and $\cdot$ are binary operations on $Q$, satisfying these axioms:

- $(Q,+)$ is a group
- $(Q_{0},\cdot)$ is a loop, where $Q_{0} = Q \setminus \{0\} \,$
- $a \cdot (b+c)=a \cdot b+a \cdot c \quad\forall a,b,c \in Q$ (left distributivity)
- $a \cdot x=b \cdot x+c$ has exactly one solution for $x$, $\forall a,b,c \in Q, a\neq b$

Strictly speaking, this is the definition of a left quasifield. A right quasifield is similarly defined, but satisfies right distributivity instead. A quasifield satisfying both distributive laws is called a semifield, in the sense in which the term is used in projective geometry.

Although not assumed, one can prove that the axioms imply that the additive group $(Q,+)$ is abelian. Thus, when referring to an abelian quasifield, one means that $(Q_0, \cdot)$ is abelian.

== Kernel ==
The kernel $K$ of a quasifield $Q$ is the set of all elements $c$ such that:

- $a \cdot(b \cdot c)=(a \cdot b) \cdot c\quad \forall a,b\in Q$
- $(a+b) \cdot c=(a \cdot c)+(b \cdot c)\quad \forall a,b\in Q$

Restricting the binary operations $+$ and $\cdot$ to $K$, one can shown that $(K,+,\cdot)$ is a division ring.

One can now make a vector space of $Q$ over $K$, with the following scalar multiplication : $v \otimes l = v \cdot l\quad \forall v\in Q,l\in K$

As a finite division ring is a finite field by Wedderburn's theorem, the order of the kernel of a finite quasifield is a prime power. The vector space construction implies that the order of any finite quasifield must also be a prime power.

== Examples ==
All division rings, and thus all fields, are quasifields.

A (right) near-field that is a (right) quasifield is called a "planar near-field".

The smallest quasifields are abelian and unique. They are the finite fields of orders up to and including eight. The smallest quasifields that are not division rings are the four non-abelian quasifields of order nine; they are presented in Hall (1959) and Weibel (2007).

== Projective planes ==
Given a quasifield $Q$, we define a ternary map $T\colon Q\times Q\times Q\to Q$ by

$$T(a,b,c)=a \cdot b+c \quad \forall a,b,c\in Q$$

One can then verify that $(Q,T)$ satisfies the axioms of a planar ternary ring. Associated to $(Q,T)$ is its corresponding projective plane. The projective planes constructed this way are characterized as follows; the details of this relationship are given in Hall (1959). A projective plane is a translation plane with respect to the line at infinity if and only if any (or all) of its associated planar ternary rings are right quasifields. It is called a shear plane if any (or all) of its ternary rings are left quasifields.

The plane does not uniquely determine the ring; all 4 nonabelian quasifields of order 9 are ternary rings for the unique non-Desarguesian translation plane of order 9. These differ in the fundamental quadrilateral used to construct the plane (see Weibel 2007).

== History ==
Quasifields were called "Veblen–Wedderburn systems" in the literature before 1975, since they were first studied in the 1907 paper (Veblen-Wedderburn 1907) by Oswald Veblen and Joseph Wedderburn. Surveys of quasifields and their applications to projective planes may be found in Hall (1959) and Weibel (2007).

== See also ==
- Near-field
- Semifield
- Alternative division ring
- Hall systems (Hall planes)
- Moufang plane
