= Double wedge =

In geometry, a double wedge is the (closure of) the symmetric difference of two half-spaces whose boundaries are not parallel to each other. For instance, in the Cartesian plane, the union of the positive and negative quadrants forms a double wedge, and more generally in two dimensions a double wedge consists of the set of points within two vertical angles defined by a pair of lines. In projective geometry double wedges are the projective duals of line segments.
