= Mordell curve =

Elliptic curve

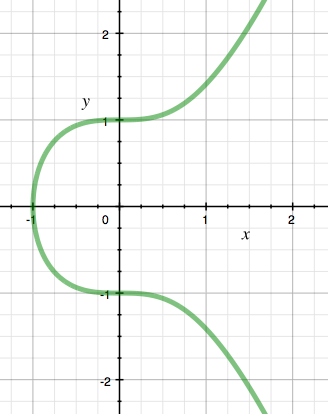
$y^2 = x^3 + 1$, with solutions at $(-1, 0)$, $(0, 1)$ and $(0, -1)$

In algebra, a Mordell curve is an elliptic curve of the form $y^2 = x^3 + n$, where $n$ is a fixed non-zero integer.

These curves were closely studied by Louis Mordell, from the point of view of determining their integer points. He showed that every Mordell curve contains only finitely many integer points $(x, y)$. In other words, the differences of perfect squares and perfect cubes tend to infinity. The question of how fast was dealt with in principle by Baker's method. Hypothetically this issue is dealt with by Marshall Hall's conjecture.

== Properties ==
- If $(x, y)$ is an integer point on a Mordell curve, then so is $(x, -y)$.
- If $(x, y)$ is a rational point on a Mordell curve with $y \ne 0$, then so is $\left( \frac{x^4 - 8nx}{4y^2}, \frac{-x^6 - 20nx^3 + 8n^2}{8y^3} \right)$. Moreover, if $xy \ne 0$ and $n$ is not 1 or −432, an infinite number of rational solutions can be generated this way. This formula is known as Bachet's duplication formula.
- When $n \ne 0$, the Mordell curve only has finitely many integer solutions (see Siegel's theorem on integral points).
- There are certain values of $n$ for which the corresponding Mordell curve has no integer solutions; these values are:

6, 7, 11, 13, 14, 20, 21, 23, 29, 32, 34, 39, 42, ... (sequence A054504 in the OEIS).
−3, −5, −6, −9, −10, −12, −14, −16, −17, −21, −22, ... (sequence A081121 in the OEIS).

- The specific case where $n = -2$ is also known as Fermat's Sandwich Theorem.

== List of solutions ==
The following is a list of solutions to the Mordell curve $y^2 = x^3 + n$ for $|n| \le 25$. Only solutions with $y \ge 0$ are shown.

$n$	$(x, y)$
1	(−1, 0), (0, 1), (2, 3)
2	(−1, 1)
3	(1, 2)
4	(0, 2)
5	(−1, 2)
6	–
7	–
8	(−2, 0), (1, 3), (2, 4), (46, 312)
9	(−2, 1), (0, 3), (3, 6), (6, 15), (40, 253)
10	(−1, 3)
11	–
12	(−2, 2), (13, 47)
13	–
14	–
15	(1, 4), (109, 1138)
16	(0, 4)
17	(−1, 4), (−2, 3), (2, 5), (4, 9), (8, 23), (43, 282), (52, 375), (5234, 378661)
18	(7, 19)
19	(5, 12)
20	–
21	–
22	(3, 7)
23	–
24	(−2, 4), (1, 5), (10, 32), (8158, 736844)
25	(0, 5)

$n$	$(x, y)$
−1	(1, 0)
−2	(3, 5)
−3	–
−4	(5, 11), (2, 2)
−5	–
−6	–
−7	(2, 1), (32, 181)
−8	(2, 0)
−9	–
−10	–
−11	(3, 4), (15, 58)
−12	–
−13	(17, 70)
−14	–
−15	(4, 7)
−16	–
−17	–
−18	(3, 3)
−19	(7, 18)
−20	(6, 14)
−21	–
−22	–
−23	(3, 2)
−24	–
−25	(5, 10)

In 1998, J. Gebel, A. Pethö, H. G. Zimmer found all integers points for $0<|n| \le 10^4$.

In 2015, M. A. Bennett and A. Ghadermarzi computed integer points for $0<|n| \le 10^7$.
