= André plane =

In mathematics, André planes are a class of finite translation planes found by André. The Desarguesian plane and the Hall planes are examples of André planes; the two-dimensional regular nearfield planes are also André planes.

== Construction ==
Let $F = GF(q)$ be a finite field, and let $K = GF(q^n)$ be a degree $n$ extension field of $F$. Let $\Gamma$ be the group of field automorphisms of $K$ over $F$, and let $\beta$ be an arbitrary mapping from $F$ to $\Gamma$ such that $\beta(1)=1$. Finally, let $N$ be the norm function from $K$ to $F$.

Define a quasifield $Q$ with the same elements and addition as K, but with multiplication defined via $a \circ b = a^{\beta(N(b))} \cdot b$, where $\cdot$ denotes the normal field multiplication in $K$. Using this quasifield to construct a plane yields an André plane.

== Properties ==
1. André planes exist for all proper prime powers $p^n$ with $p$ prime and $n$ a positive integer greater than one.
2. Non-Desarguesian André planes exist for all proper prime powers except for $2^n$ where $n$ is prime.

== Small examples ==
For planes of order 25 and below, classification of Andrè planes is a consequence of either theoretical calculations or computer searches which have determined all translation planes of a given order:

- The smallest non-Desarguesian André plane has order 9, and it is isomorphic to the Hall plane of that order.
- The translation planes of order 16 have all been classified, and again the only non-Desarguesian André plane is the Hall plane.
- There are three non-Desarguesian André planes of order 25. These are the Hall plane, the regular nearfield plane, and a third plane not constructible by other techniques.
- There is a single non-Desarguesian André plane of order 27.

Enumeration of Andrè planes specifically has been performed for other small orders:

Order	Number of non-Desarguesian Andrè planes
9	1
16	1
25	3
27	1
49	7
64	6 (four 2-d, two 3-d)
81	14 (13 2-d, one 4-d)
121	43
125	6
