= Hall's conjecture =

Unsolved problem in mathematics

In mathematics, Hall's conjecture is an open question on the differences between perfect squares and perfect cubes. It asserts that a perfect square $y^2$ and a perfect cube $x^3$ that are not equal must lie a substantial distance apart. This question arose from consideration of the Mordell equation in the theory of integer points on elliptic curves.

The original version of Hall's conjecture, formulated by Marshall Hall, Jr. in 1970, says that there is a positive constant $C$ such that for any integers $x$ and $y$ for which $y^2 \neq x^3$,

$$|y^2 - x^3| > C|x|^{1/2}$$.

Hall suggested that perhaps $C$ could be taken as $1/5$, which was consistent with all the data known at the time the conjecture was proposed.

In 1982, Danilov proved that $|y^2-x^3|$ is less than $433\sqrt{2}\times|x|^{1/2}$ infinitely often, thus providing an upper bound on $C$ and proving that the exponent $1/2$ (that is, the use of $|x|^{1/2}$) is optimal and cannot be replaced by any higher power: for no $\delta > 0$ is there a constant $C$ such that $|y^2 - x^3| > C|x|^{1/2+\delta}$ whenever $y^2 \neq x^3$.

In 1965, Davenport proved an analogue of the above conjecture in the case of polynomials: if $f(t)$ and $g(t)$ are nonzero polynomials over the complex numbers $\mathbb{C}$ such that $g(t)^3\neq f(t)^2$ in $\mathbb{C}[t]$, then

$$\deg(g(t)^2 - f(t)^3) \geq \frac{1}{2}\deg f(t) + 1.$$

The weak form of Hall's conjecture, stated by Stark and Trotter around 1980, replaces the square root on the right side of the inequality by any exponent less than $1/2$: for any $\varepsilon > 0$, there is some constant $c(\varepsilon)$ depending on $\varepsilon$ such that for any integers $x$ and $y$ for which $y^2 \neq x^3$,

$$|y^2 - x^3| > c(\varepsilon) |x|^{1/2 - \varepsilon}$$.

The original, strong, form of the conjecture with exponent $1/2$ has never been disproved, although it is no longer believed to be true and the term Hall's conjecture now generally means the version with the $\varepsilon$ in it. For example, in 1998, Noam Elkies found the example

$447884928428402042307918^2 - 5853886516781223^3 = -1641843$,

for which compatibility with Hall's conjecture would require $C$ to be less than $0.0214\approx1/50$, so roughly 10 times smaller than the original choice of $1/5$ that Hall suggested.

The weak form of Hall's conjecture would follow from the ABC conjecture. A generalization to other perfect powers is Pillai's conjecture, though it is also known that Pillai's conjecture would be true if Hall's conjecture held for any specific $0<\varepsilon<1/2$.

The table below displays the known cases with $r = \sqrt{x}/|y^2-x^3| > 1$. Note that y can be computed as the nearest integer to x^{3/2}. This list is known to contain all examples with $x \le 10^{29}$ (the first 44 entries in the table) but may be incomplete past that point.

#	x	r	
1	2	1.41	
2	5234	4.26	(Note: J. Gebel, A. Pethö and H.G. Zimmer.)
3	8158	3.76	
4	93844	1.03	
5	367806	2.93	
6	421351	1.05	
7	720114	3.77	
8	939787	3.16	
9	28187351	4.87	
10	110781386	1.23	
11	154319269	1.08	
12	384242766	1.34	
13	390620082	1.33	
14	3790689201	2.20	
15	65589428378	2.19	(Note: Noam D. Elkies (including entry 16 which Elkies found but omitted from his published table).)
16	952764389446	1.15	
17	12438517260105	1.27	
18	35495694227489	1.15	
19	53197086958290	1.66	
20	5853886516781223	46.60	
21	12813608766102806	1.30	
22	23415546067124892	1.46	
23	38115991067861271	6.50	
24	322001299796379844	1.04	
25	471477085999389882	1.38	
26	810574762403977064	4.66	
27	9870884617163518770	1.90	(Note: I. Jiménez Calvo, J. Herranz and G. Sáez (with the order of entries 29 and 30 corrected))
28	42532374580189966073	3.47	
29	44648329463517920535	1.79	
30	51698891432429706382	1.75	
31	231411667627225650649	3.71	
32	601724682280310364065	1.88	
33	4996798823245299750533	2.17	
34	5592930378182848874404	1.38	
35	14038790674256691230847	1.27	
36	77148032713960680268604	10.18	(Note: Johan Bosman (using the software of JHS).)
37	180179004295105849668818	5.65	
38	372193377967238474960883	1.33	
39	664947779818324205678136	16.53	
40	2028871373185892500636155	1.14	
41	10747835083471081268825856	1.35	
42	37223900078734215181946587	1.87	
43	69586951610485633367491417	1.22	(Note: S. Aanderaa, L. Kristiansen and H.K. Ruud.)
44	3690445383173227306376634720	1.51	
45	133545763574262054617147641349	1.69	
46	162921297743817207342396140787	10.65	
47	374192690896219210878121645171	2.97	
48	401844774500818781164623821177	1.29	
49	500859224588646106403669009291	1.06	
50	1114592308630995805123571151844	1.04	(Note: L.V. Danilov. Item 50 belongs to the infinite sequence found by Danilov.)
51	39739590925054773507790363346813	3.75	
52	862611143810724763613366116643858	1.10	
53	1062521751024771376590062279975859	1.006	
54	6078673043126084065007902175846955	1.03	
