= Marshall Hall (mathematician) =

American mathematician (1910–1990)

Marshall Hall Jr.
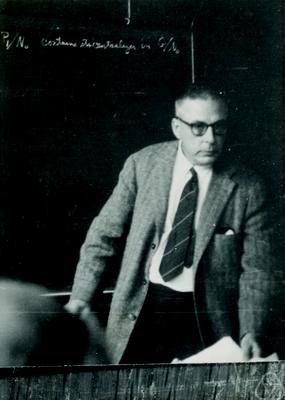
- Marshall Hall Jr.
- Born: 17 September 1910; St Louis, Missouri, U.S.
- Died: 4 July 1990 (aged 79); London, England
- Education: Cambridge University; Yale University
- Known for: Group theory Combinatorics; Hall's conjecture Hall multiplier Hall plane Hall-Janko group Planar ternary ring
- Scientific career
- Fields: Abstract algebra
- Workplaces: Yale University; Ohio State University; California Institute of Technology; Emory University
- Thesis: An isomorphism between linear recurring sequences and algebraic rings (1936)
- Doctoral advisor: Øystein Ore
- Doctoral students: Robert Calderbank; Donald Knuth; Robert McEliece; E. T. Parker

Marshall Hall Jr. (17 September 1910 – 4 July 1990) was an American mathematician who made significant contributions to group theory and combinatorics.

== Education and career ==
Hall studied mathematics at Yale University, graduating in 1932. He studied for a year at Cambridge University under a Henry Fellowship working with G. H. Hardy. He returned to Yale to take his Ph.D. in 1936 under the supervision of Øystein Ore.

He worked in Naval Intelligence during World War II, including six months in 1944 at Bletchley Park, the center of British wartime code breaking. In 1946 he took a position at Ohio State University. In 1959 he moved to the California Institute of Technology where, in 1973, he was named the first IBM Professor at Caltech, the first named chair in mathematics. After retiring from Caltech in 1981, he accepted a post at Emory University in 1985.

Hall died in 1990 in London on his way to a conference to mark his 80th birthday.

== Contributions ==
He wrote a number of papers of fundamental importance in group theory, including his solution of Burnside's problem for groups of exponent 6, showing that a finitely generated group in which the order of every element divides 6 must be finite.

His work in combinatorics includes an important paper of 1943 on projective planes, which for many years was one of the most cited mathematics research papers. In this paper he constructed a family of non-Desarguesian planes which are known today as Hall planes. He also worked on block designs and coding theory.

His classic book on group theory was well received when it came out and is still useful today. His book Combinatorial Theory came out in a second edition in 1986, published by John Wiley & Sons.

He proposed Hall's conjecture on the differences between perfect squares and perfect cubes, which remains an open problem as of 2015.

Hall's work on continued fractions showed that the Lagrange spectrum includes all numbers greater than 6. This interval is known as Hall's Ray. The lower limit of Hall's ray was established by Freiman in 1975.

== Publications ==
- 1943: "Projective Planes", Transactions of the American Mathematical Society 54(2): 229–77 doi:10.2307/1990331
- 1959: The Theory of Groups, Macmillan MR 0103215
  - Wilhelm Magnus (1960) Review: Marshall Hall, Jr. Theory of Groups Bulletin of the American Mathematical Society 66(3): 144–6.
  - The Theory of Groups. Providence, RI: American Mathematical Soc. 1999. ISBN 978-0-8218-1967-8.
- 1964: (with James K. Senior) The Groups of Order 2^{n} n ≤ 6), Macmillan MR 0168631
  - Preface: "An exhaustive catalog of the 340 groups of order dividing 64 with detailed tables of defining relations, constants, and lattice presentations of each group in the notation the text defines. "Of enduring value to those interested in finite groups".
- 1967: Combinatorial Theory, Blaisdell MR 0224481
  - Combinatorial Theory. New York: Wiley-Interscience. 1986. ISBN 978-0-471-09138-7.
