= Semifield =

Algebraic structure

In mathematics, a semifield is an algebraic structure with two binary operations, addition and multiplication, which is similar to a field, but with some axioms relaxed.

== Overview ==
The term semifield has two conflicting meanings, both of which include fields as a special case.

- In projective geometry and finite geometry (MSC 51A, 51E, 12K10), a semifield is a nonassociative division ring with multiplicative identity element. More precisely, it is a nonassociative ring whose nonzero elements form a loop under multiplication. In other words, a semifield is a set S with two operations + (addition) and · (multiplication), such that
  - (S,+) is an abelian group,
  - multiplication is distributive on both the left and right,
  - there exists a multiplicative identity element, and
  - division is always possible: for every a and every nonzero b in S, there exist unique x and y in S for which b·x = a and y·b = a.

Note in particular that the multiplication is not assumed to be commutative or associative. A semifield that is associative is a division ring, and one that is both associative and commutative is a field. A semifield by this definition is a special case of a quasifield. If S is finite, the last axiom in the definition above can be replaced with the assumption that there are no zero divisors, so that a⋅b = 0 implies that a = 0 or b = 0. Note that due to the lack of associativity, the last axiom is not equivalent to the assumption that every nonzero element has a multiplicative inverse, as is usually found in definitions of fields and division rings.

- In ring theory, combinatorics, functional analysis, and theoretical computer science (MSC 16Y60), a semifield is a semiring (S,+,·) in which all nonzero elements have a multiplicative inverse. These objects are also called proper semifields. A variation of this definition arises if S contains an absorbing zero that is different from the multiplicative unit e, it is required that the non-zero elements be invertible, and a·0 = 0·a = 0. Since multiplication is associative, the (non-zero) elements of a semifield form a group. However, the pair (S,+) is only a semigroup, i.e. additive inverse need not exist, or, colloquially, 'there is no subtraction'. Sometimes, it is not assumed that the multiplication is associative.

== Primitivity of semifields ==
A semifield D is called right (resp. left) primitive if it has an element w such that the set of nonzero elements of D* is equal to the set of all right (resp. left) principal powers of w.

== Examples ==
We only give examples of semifields in the second sense, i.e. additive semigroups with distributive multiplication. Moreover, addition is commutative and multiplication is associative in our examples.

- Positive rational numbers with the usual addition and multiplication form a commutative semifield.
  This can be extended by an absorbing 0.
- Positive real numbers with the usual addition and multiplication form a commutative semifield.
  This can be extended by an absorbing 0, forming the probability semiring, which is isomorphic to the log semiring.
- Rational functions of the form f /g, where f and g are polynomials over a subfield of real numbers in one variable with positive coefficients, form a commutative semifield.
  This can be extended to include 0.
- The real numbers R can be viewed a semifield where the sum of two elements is defined to be their maximum and the product to be their ordinary sum; this semifield is more compactly denoted (R, max, +). Similarly (R, min, +) is a semifield. These are called the tropical semiring.
  This can be extended by −∞ (an absorbing 0); this is the limit (tropicalization) of the log semiring as the base goes to infinity.
- Generalizing the previous example, if (A,·,≤) is a lattice-ordered group then (A,+,·) is an additively idempotent semifield with the semifield sum defined to be the supremum of two elements. Conversely, any additively idempotent semifield (A,+,·) defines a lattice-ordered group (A,·,≤), where a≤b if and only if a + b = b.
- The Boolean semifield B = {0, 1} with addition defined by logical or, and multiplication defined by logical and.

== See also ==
- Planar ternary ring (first sense)
