= Planar ternary ring =

Construction in projective geometry

In mathematics, an algebraic structure $(R,T)$ consisting of a non-empty set $R$ and a ternary mapping $T \colon R^3 \to R \,$ may be called a ternary system. A planar ternary ring (PTR) or ternary field is a special type of ternary system used by Marshall Hall to construct projective planes by means of coordinates. A planar ternary ring is not a ring in the traditional sense, but any field gives a planar ternary ring where the operation $T$ is defined by $T(a,b,c) = ab + c$. Thus, we can think of a planar ternary ring as a generalization of a field where the ternary operation takes the place of both addition and multiplication.

There is wide variation in the terminology. Planar ternary rings or ternary fields as defined here have been called by other names in the literature, and the term "planar ternary ring" can mean a variant of the system defined here. The term "ternary ring" often means a planar ternary ring, but it can also simply mean a ternary system.

== Definition ==
A planar ternary ring is a structure $(R,T)$ where $R$ is a set containing at least two distinct elements, called 0 and 1, and $T\colon R^3\to R \,$ is a mapping which satisfies these five axioms:

1. $T(a,0,b)=T(0,a,b)=b,\quad \forall a,b \in R$;
2. $T(1,a,0)=T(a,1,0)=a,\quad \forall a \in R$;
3. $\forall a,b,c,d \in R, a\neq c$, there is a unique $x\in R$ such that : $T(x,a,b)=T(x,c,d) \,$;
4. $\forall a,b,c \in R$, there is a unique $x \in R$, such that $T(a,b,x)=c \,$; and
5. $\forall a,b,c,d \in R, a\neq c$, the equations $T(a,x,y)=b,T(c,x,y)=d \,$ have a unique solution $(x,y)\in R^2$.

When $R$ is finite, the third and fifth axioms are equivalent in the presence of the fourth.

No other pair (0', 1') in $R^2$ can be found such that $T$ still satisfies the first two axioms.

== Binary operations ==
=== Addition ===
Define $a\oplus b=T(a,1,b)$. The structure $(R,\oplus)$ is a loop with identity element 0.

=== Multiplication ===
Define $a\otimes b=T(a,b,0)$. The set $R_{0} = R \setminus \{0\} \,$ is closed under this multiplication. The structure $(R_{0},\otimes)$ is also a loop, with identity element 1.

=== Linear PTR ===
A planar ternary ring $(R,T)$ is said to be linear if $T(a,b,c)=(a\otimes b)\oplus c,\quad \forall a,b,c \in R$. For example, the planar ternary ring associated to a quasifield is (by construction) linear.

== Connection with projective planes ==
Coordinates of a projective plane to establish a planar ternary ring

Given a planar ternary ring $(R,T)$, one can construct a projective plane with point set P and line set L as follows: (Note that $\infty$ is an extra symbol not in $R$.)

Let

- $P=\{(a,b)|a,b\in R\}\cup \{(a)|a \in R \}\cup \{(\infty)\}$, and
- $L=\{[a,b]|a,b \in R\}\cup\{[a]|a \in R \}\cup \{[\infty]\}$.

Then define, $\forall a,b,c,d \in R$, the incidence relation $I$ in this way:

$$((a,b),[c,d])\in I \Longleftrightarrow T(a,c,d)=b$$
$$((a,b),[c])\in I \Longleftrightarrow a=c$$
$$((a,b),[\infty])\notin I$$
$$((a), [c,d])\in I \Longleftrightarrow a=c$$
$$((a), [c])\notin I$$
$$((a),[\infty])\in I$$
$$((\infty),[c,d])\notin I$$
$$((\infty),[a])\in I$$
$$((\infty),[\infty])\in I$$

Every projective plane can be constructed in this way, starting with an appropriate planar ternary ring. However, two nonisomorphic planar ternary rings can lead to the construction of isomorphic projective planes.

Conversely, given any projective plane π, by choosing four points, labelled o, e, u, and v, no three of which lie on the same line, coordinates can be introduced in π so that these special points are given the coordinates: o = (0,0), e = (1,1), v = ($\infty$) and u = (0). The ternary operation is now defined on the coordinate symbols (except $\infty$) by y = T(x,a,b) if and only if the point (x,y) lies on the line which joins (a) with (0,b). The axioms defining a projective plane are used to show that this gives a planar ternary ring.

Linearity of the PTR is equivalent to a geometric condition holding in the associated projective plane.

=== Intuition ===
The algebraic structure of a planar ternary ring (PTR) corresponds directly to the coordinates of an affine plane. While PTRs are often used to classify projective planes, the connection is best understood by examining the affine case first.

In affine geometry, points are described using Cartesian coordinates. This method is applicable even in non-Desarguesian geometries; in such contexts, the coordinate components always obey the structure of a PTR. By contrast, the homogeneous coordinates typically used in projective geometry are unavailable in non-Desarguesian contexts. Thus, the simplest analytic way to construct a projective plane in this context is to start with an affine plane and extend it by adding a "line at infinity".

In an affine plane, the algebraic representation of lines depends on the geometry:

- In a Desarguesian plane, lines follow the standard slope-intercept form $y = mx + c$.
- In a non-Desarguesian plane, this representation extends through the ternary operation of a PTR, expressed as $y = T(x, m, c)$.

In both cases, lines parallel to the y-axis are expressed as $x = c$.

We can now derive the analytic representation of a general projective plane, denoted as $R\mathbb{P}^2$. This involves expanding the affine plane ($R^2$) by including the line at infinity. Formally, the projective plane is described as:

$$R\mathbb{P}^2 := R^2 \cup R\mathbb{P}^1$$

Where $R^2$ represents the affine plane (all finite points in Cartesian coordinates) and $R\mathbb{P}^1$ denotes the line at infinity.

To fully define the geometry, the line at infinity is further decomposed:

$$R\mathbb{P}^1 := R^1 \cup R \mathbb{P}^0$$

Here, $R^1$ is an affine line with its own Cartesian coordinate system, and $R \mathbb{P}^0$ consists of a single point (often represented as $\infty$) not lying on that affine line.

== Related algebraic structures ==
PTR's which satisfy additional algebraic conditions are given other names. These names are not uniformly applied in the literature. The following listing of names and properties is taken from Dembowski (1968, p. 129).

A linear PTR whose additive loop is associative (and thus a group ), is called a cartesian group. In a cartesian group, the mappings

$x \longrightarrow -x \otimes a + x \otimes b$, and $x \longrightarrow a \otimes x - b \otimes x$

must be permutations whenever $a \neq b$. Since cartesian groups are groups under addition, we revert to using a simple "+" for the additive operation.

A quasifield is a cartesian group satisfying the right distributive law: $(x+y) \otimes z = x \otimes z + y \otimes z$. Addition in any quasifield is commutative.

A semifield is a quasifield which also satisfies the left distributive law: $x \otimes (y + z) = x \otimes y + x \otimes z.$

A planar nearfield is a quasifield whose multiplicative loop is associative (and hence a group). Not all nearfields are planar nearfields.
