= Wedderburn's little theorem =

Result in algebra

In mathematics, Wedderburn's little theorem states that every finite division ring is a field; thus, every finite domain is a field. In other words, for finite rings, there is no distinction between domains, division rings and fields.

The Artin–Zorn theorem generalizes the theorem to alternative rings: every finite alternative division ring is a field.

== History ==
The original proof was given by Joseph Wedderburn in 1905, who went on to prove the theorem in two other ways. Another proof was given by Leonard Eugene Dickson shortly after Wedderburn's original proof, and Dickson acknowledged Wedderburn's priority. However, as noted in (Parshall 1983), Wedderburn's first proof was incorrect – it had a gap – and his subsequent proofs appeared only after he had read Dickson's correct proof. On this basis, Parshall argues that Dickson should be credited with the first correct proof.

A simplified version of the proof was later given by Ernst Witt. Witt's proof is sketched below. Alternatively, the theorem is a consequence of the Skolem–Noether theorem by the following argument. Let $D$ be a finite division algebra with center $k$. Let $[D:k]=n^{2}$ and $q$ denote the cardinality of $k$. Every maximal subfield of $D$ has $q^{n}$ elements; so they are isomorphic and thus are conjugate by Skolem–Noether. But a finite group (the multiplicative group of $D$ in our case) cannot be a union of conjugates of a proper subgroup; hence, $n = 1$.

A later "group-theoretic" proof was given by Ted Kaczynski in 1964. This proof, Kaczynski's first published piece of mathematical writing, was a short, two-page note which also acknowledged the earlier historical proofs.

== Relationship to the Brauer group of a finite field ==
The theorem is essentially equivalent to saying that the Brauer group of a finite field is trivial. In fact, this characterization immediately yields a proof of the theorem as follows: let K be a finite field. Since the Herbrand quotient vanishes by finiteness, $\operatorname{Br}(K) = H^2(K^{\text{al}}/K)$ coincides with $H^1(K^{\text{al}}/K)$, which in turn vanishes by Hilbert 90.

The triviality of the Brauer group can also be obtained by direct computation, as follows. Let $|K| = q,$ and let $L/K$ be a finite extension of degree $n,$ so that $|L|=q^n.$ Then $\mathrm{Gal}(L/K)$ is a cyclic group of order $n,$ and the standard method of computing cohomology of finite cyclic groups shows that
$$H^2(L/K) = K^{\times}/N_{L/K}(L^{\times}),$$
where the norm map $N_{L/K}:L^{\times} \to K^{\times}$ is given by
$$N_{L/K}(\alpha) = \prod_{\sigma \in \mathrm{Gal}(L/K)} \sigma(\alpha) = \alpha \cdot \alpha^{q} \cdot \alpha^{q^2} \cdots \alpha^{q^{n-1}} = \alpha^{\frac{q^n-1}{q-1}}.$$
Taking $\alpha$ to be a generator of the cyclic group $L^{\times},$ we find that $N_{L/K}(\alpha)$ has order $q-1,$ and therefore it must be a generator of $K^{\times}$. This implies that $N_{L/K}$ is surjective, and therefore $H^{2}(L/K)$ is trivial.

== Proof ==
Let $A$ be a finite domain. For each nonzero $b$ in $A$, the two maps

$$a \mapsto ab, a \mapsto ba: A \to A$$

are injective by the cancellation property, and thus, surjective by counting. It follows from elementary group theory that the nonzero elements of $A$ form a group under multiplication. Thus, $A$ is a division ring.

Since the center $Z(A)$ of $A$ is a field, $A$ is a vector space over $Z(A)$ with finite dimension $n$. Our objective is then to show $n = 1$. If $q$ is the order of $Z(A)$, then $A$ has order ${q}^{n}$. Note that because $Z(A)$ contains the distinct elements $0$ and $1$, $q>1$. For each $b$ in $A$ that is not in the center, the centralizer ${Z}_{b}$ of $b$ is a vector space over $Z(A)$, hence it has order ${q}^{d}$ where $d$ is less than $n$. Viewing ${Z(A)}^{*}$, $A^{*}$, and ${Z}^{*}_{b}$ as groups under multiplication, we can write the class equation

$$q^n - 1 = q - 1 + \sum {q^n - 1 \over q^d - 1}$$

where the sum is taken over the conjugacy classes not contained within ${Z(A)}^{*}$, and the $d$ are defined so that for each conjugacy class, the order of ${Z}^{*}_{b}$ for any $x$ in the class is ${q}^{d} - 1$. In particular, the fact that ${Z}^{*}_{b}$ is a subgroup of $A^{*}$ implies that $q^d-1$ divides $q^n-1$, whence $d$ divides $n$ by elementary algebra.

${q}^{n} - 1$ and $q^{d} - 1$ both admit polynomial factorization in terms of cyclotomic polynomials $\Phi_f(q)$. The cyclotomic polynomials on $\Q$ are in $\Z[x]$, and satisfy the identities

$x^n-1 = \prod_{m\mid n} \Phi_m(x)$ and $x^d-1 = \prod_{m\mid d} \Phi_m(x)$.

Since each $d$ is a proper divisor of $n$,

$\Phi_n(x)$ divides both ${x}^{n} - 1$ and each ${x^n - 1 \over x^d - 1}$ in $\Z[x]$,

thus by the class equation above, $\Phi_n(q)$ must divide $q - 1$, and therefore by taking the norms,

$$|\Phi_n(q)| \leq q-1$$.

To see that this forces $n$ to be $1$, we will show

$$|\Phi_n(q)| > q-1$$

for $n>1$ using factorization over the complex numbers. In the polynomial identity

$$\Phi_n(x) = \prod (x - \zeta),$$

where $\zeta$ runs over the primitive $n$-th roots of unity, set $x$ to be $q$ and then take absolute values

$$|\Phi_n(q)| = \prod |q - \zeta|.$$

For $n>1$, we see that for each primitive $n$-th root of unity $\zeta$,

$$|q-\zeta| > |q-1|$$

because of the location of $q$, $1$, and $\zeta$ in the complex plane. Since $q \geq 2$, the term $q-1$ is at least $1$. Thus

$$|\Phi_n(q)| > q-1.$$
