= Near-field (mathematics) =

Algebraic structure

In mathematics, a near-field is an algebraic structure similar to a division ring, except that it has only one of the two distributive laws. Alternatively, a near-field is a near-ring in which there is a multiplicative identity and every non-zero element has a multiplicative inverse.

== Definition ==
A near-field is a set $Q$ together with two binary operations, $+$ (addition) and $\cdot$ (multiplication), satisfying the following axioms for all $a, b, c$ in $Q$.

A1: $(Q, +)$ is an abelian group.
A2: $(a \cdot b) \cdot c = a \cdot (b \cdot c)$ (The associative law for multiplication).
A3: $(a + b) \cdot c = a \cdot c + b \cdot c$ (The right distributive law).
A4: $Q$ contains a non-zero element 1 such that $1 \cdot a = a \cdot 1 = a$ (Multiplicative identity).
A5: For every non-zero element $d$ in $Q$ there exists an element $d^{-1}$ such that $d \cdot d^{-1} = 1 = d^{-1} \cdot d$ (Multiplicative inverse).

=== Notes on the definition ===
1. The above is, strictly speaking, a definition of a right near-field. By replacing A3 by the left distributive law $c \cdot (a + b) = c \cdot a + c\cdot b$ we get a left near-field instead. Most commonly, "near-field" is taken as meaning "right near-field", but this is not a universal convention.
2. A (right) near-field is called "planar" if it is also a right quasifield. Every finite near-field is planar, but infinite near-fields need not be.
3. It is not necessary to specify that the additive group is abelian, as this follows from the other axioms, as proved by B.H. Neumann and J.L. Zemmer. However, the proof is quite difficult, and it is more convenient to include this in the axioms so that progress with establishing the properties of near-fields can start more rapidly.
4. Sometimes a list of axioms is given in which A4 and A5 are replaced by the following single statement:
  A4*: The non-zero elements form a group under multiplication.
  However, this alternative definition includes one exceptional structure of order 2 which fails to satisfy various basic theorems (such as $x \cdot 0 = 0$ for all $x$). Thus it is much more convenient, and more usual, to use the axioms in the form given above. The difference is that A4 requires 1 to be an identity for all elements, A4* only for non-zero elements.
  The exceptional structure can be defined by taking an additive group of order 2, and defining multiplication by $x \cdot y = x$ for all $x$ and $y$.

== Examples ==
1. Any division ring (including any field) is a near-field.
2. The following defines a (right) near-field of order 9. It is the smallest near-field which is not a field.
  Let $K$ be the Galois field of order 9. Denote multiplication in $K$ by ' $*$ '. Define a new binary operation ' · ' by:
  If $b$ is any element of $K$ which is a square and $a$ is any element of $K$ then $a \cdot b = a*b$.
  If $b$ is any element of $K$ which is not a square and $a$ is any element of $K$ then $a \cdot b = a^3*b$.
  Then $K$ is a near-field with this new multiplication and the same addition as before.

== History and applications ==
The concept of a near-field was first introduced by Leonard Dickson in 1905. He took division rings and modified their multiplication, while leaving addition as it was, and thus produced the first known examples of near-fields that were not division rings. The near-fields produced by this method are known as Dickson near-fields; the near-field of order 9 given above is a Dickson near-field. Hans Zassenhaus proved that all but 7 finite near-fields are either fields or Dickson near-fields.

The earliest application of the concept of near-field was in the study of incidence geometries such as projective planes. Many projective planes can be defined in terms of a coordinate system over a division ring, but others can not. It was found that by allowing coordinates from any near-ring the range of geometries which could be coordinatized was extended. For example, Marshall Hall used the near-field of order 9 given above to produce a Hall plane, the first of a sequence of such planes based on Dickson near-fields of order the square of a prime. In 1971 T. G. Room and P.B. Kirkpatrick provided an alternative development.

There are numerous other applications, mostly to geometry. A more recent application of near-fields is in the construction of ciphers for data-encryption, such as Hill ciphers.

== Description in terms of Frobenius groups and group automorphisms ==
Let $K$ be a near field. Let $K_m$ be its multiplicative group and let $K_a$ be its additive group. Let $c \in K_m$ act on $b \in K_a$ by $b \mapsto b \cdot c$. The axioms of a near field show that this is a right group action by group automorphisms of $K_a,$ and the nonzero elements of $K_a$ form a single orbit with trivial stabilizer.

Conversely, if $A$ is an abelian group and $M$ is a subgroup of $\mathrm{Aut}(A)$ which acts freely and transitively on the nonzero elements of $A$, then we can define a near field with additive group $A$ and multiplicative group $M$. Choose an element in $A$ to call $1$ and let $\phi: M \to A \setminus \{ 0 \}$ be the bijection $m \mapsto 1 \ast m$. Then we define addition on $A$ by the additive group structure on $A$ and define multiplication by $a \cdot b = 1 \ast \phi^{-1}(a) \phi^{-1}(b)$.

A Frobenius group can be defined as a finite group of the form $A \rtimes M$ where $M$ acts without stabilizer on the nonzero elements of $A$. Thus, near fields are in bijection with Frobenius groups where $|M| = |A|-1$.

== Classification ==
As mentioned above, Zassenhaus proved that all finite near fields either arise from a construction of Dickson or are one of seven exceptional examples. We will describe this classification by giving pairs $(A,M)$ where $A$ is an abelian group and $M$ is a group of automorphisms of $A$ which acts freely and transitively on the nonzero elements of $A$.

The construction of Dickson proceeds as follows. Let $q$ be a prime power and choose a positive integer $n$ such that all prime factors of $n$ divide $q-1$ and, if $q \equiv 3 \bmod 4$, then $n$ is not divisible by $4$. Let $F$ be the finite field of order $q^n$ and let $A$ be the additive group of $F$. The multiplicative group of $F$, together with the Frobenius automorphism $x \mapsto x^q$ generate a group of automorphisms of $F$ of the form $C_n \ltimes C_{q^n-1}$, where $C_k$ is the cyclic group of order $k$. The divisibility conditions on $n$ allow us to find a subgroup of $C_n \ltimes C_{q^n-1}$ of order $q^n-1$ which acts freely and transitively on $A$. The case $n=1$ is the case of commutative finite fields; the nine element example above is $q=3$, $n=2$.

In the seven exceptional examples, $A$ is of the form $C_p^2$. This table, including the numbering by Roman numerals, is taken from Zassenhaus's paper.

	$A=C_p^2$	Generators for $M$	Description(s) of $M$
I	$p=5$	$\left( \begin{smallmatrix} 0 & -1 \\ 1 & 0 \\ \end{smallmatrix} \right)$ $\left( \begin{smallmatrix} 1 & -2 \\ -1 & -2 \\ \end{smallmatrix} \right)$	$2T$, the binary tetrahedral group.
II	$p=11$	$\left( \begin{smallmatrix} 0 & -1 \\ 1 & 0 \\ \end{smallmatrix} \right)$ $\left( \begin{smallmatrix} 1 & 5 \\ -5 & -2 \\ \end{smallmatrix} \right)$ $\left( \begin{smallmatrix} 4 & 0 \\ 0 & 4 \\ \end{smallmatrix} \right)$	$2 T \times C_5$
III	$p=7$	$\left( \begin{smallmatrix} 0 & -1 \\ 1 & 0 \\ \end{smallmatrix} \right)$ $\left( \begin{smallmatrix} 1 & 3 \\ -1 & -2 \\ \end{smallmatrix} \right)$	$2 O$, the binary octahedral group.
IV	$p=23$	$\left( \begin{smallmatrix} 0 & -1 \\ 1 & 0 \\ \end{smallmatrix} \right)$ $\left( \begin{smallmatrix} 1 & -6 \\ 12 & -2 \\ \end{smallmatrix} \right)$ $\left( \begin{smallmatrix} 2 & 0 \\ 0 & 2 \\ \end{smallmatrix} \right)$	$2 O \times C_{11}$
V	$p=11$	$\left( \begin{smallmatrix} 0 & -1 \\ 1 & 0 \\ \end{smallmatrix} \right)$ $\left( \begin{smallmatrix} 2 & 4 \\ 1 & -3 \\ \end{smallmatrix} \right)$	$2 I$, the binary icosahedral group.
VI	$p=29$	$\left( \begin{smallmatrix} 0 & -1 \\ 1 & 0 \\ \end{smallmatrix} \right)$ $\left( \begin{smallmatrix} 1 & -7 \\ -12 & -2 \\ \end{smallmatrix} \right)$ $\left( \begin{smallmatrix} 16 & 0 \\ 0 & 16 \\ \end{smallmatrix} \right)$	$2 I \times C_{7}$
VII	$p=59$	$\left( \begin{smallmatrix} 0 & -1 \\ 1 & 0 \\ \end{smallmatrix} \right)$ $\left( \begin{smallmatrix} 9 & 15 \\ -10 & -10 \\ \end{smallmatrix} \right)$ $\left( \begin{smallmatrix} 4 & 0 \\ 0 & 4 \\ \end{smallmatrix} \right)$	$2 I \times C_{29}$

The binary tetrahedral, octahedral and icosahedral groups are central extensions of the rotational symmetry groups of the platonic solids; these rotational symmetry groups are $A_4$, $S_4$ and $A_5$ respectively. $2T$ and $2 I$ can also be described as $SL(2,\mathbb{F}_3)$ and $SL(2,\mathbb{F}_5)$.

== See also ==
- Near-ring
- Planar ternary ring
- Quasifield
