= Hughes plane =

Concept in geometry

In mathematics, a Hughes plane is one of the non-Desarguesian projective planes found by Hughes (1957). There are examples of order p^{2n} for every odd prime p and every positive integer n.

== Construction ==
The construction of a Hughes plane is based on a nearfield N of order p^{2n} for p an odd prime whose kernel K has order p^{n} and coincides with the center of N.

== Properties ==
A Hughes plane H:

1. is a non-Desarguesian projective plane of odd square prime power order of Lenz-Barlotti type I.1,
2. has a Desarguesian Baer subplane H_{0},
3. is a self-dual plane in which every orthogonal polarity of H_{0} can be extended to a polarity of H,
4. every central collineation of H_{0} extends to a central collineation of H, and
5. the full collineation group of H has two point orbits (one of which is H_{0}), two line orbits, and four flag orbits.

== The smallest Hughes Plane (order 9) ==
The Hughes plane of order 9 was actually found earlier by Veblen and Wedderburn in 1907. A construction of this plane can be found in Room & Kirkpatrick (1971) where it is called the plane Ψ.
