= Collineation =

In projective geometry, a bijection between projective spaces that preserves collinearity

In projective geometry, a collineation is a one-to-one and onto map (a bijection) from one projective space to another, or from a projective space to itself, such that the images of collinear points are themselves collinear. A collineation is thus an isomorphism between projective spaces, or an automorphism from a projective space to itself. Some authors restrict the definition of collineation to the case where it is an automorphism. The set of all collineations of a space to itself form a group, called the collineation group.

== Definition ==
Simply, a collineation is a one-to-one map from one projective space to another, or from a projective space to itself, such that the images of collinear points are themselves collinear. One may formalize this using various ways of presenting a projective space. Also, the case of the projective line is special, and hence generally treated differently.

=== Linear algebra ===
For a projective space defined in terms of linear algebra (as the projectivization of a vector space), a collineation is a map between the projective spaces that is order-preserving with respect to inclusion of subspaces.

Formally, let V be a vector space over a field K and W a vector space over a field L. Consider the projective spaces PG(V) and PG(W), consisting of the vector lines of V and W. Call D(V) and D(W) the set of subspaces of V and W respectively. A collineation from PG(V) to PG(W) is a map α : D(V) → D(W), such that:

- α is a bijection.
- A ⊆ B ⇔ α(A) ⊆ α(B) for all A, B in D(V).

=== Axiomatically ===
Given a projective space defined axiomatically in terms of an incidence structure (a set of points P, lines L, and an incidence relation I specifying which points lie on which lines, satisfying certain axioms), a collineation between projective spaces thus defined then being a bijective function f between the sets of points and a bijective function g between the set of lines, preserving the incidence relation.

Every projective space of dimension greater than or equal to three is isomorphic to the projectivization of a linear space over a division ring, so in these dimensions this definition is no more general than the linear-algebraic one above, but in dimension two there are other projective planes, namely the non-Desarguesian planes, and this definition allows one to define collineations in such projective planes.

For dimension one, the set of points lying on a single projective line defines a projective space, and the resulting notion of collineation is just any bijection of the set.

=== Collineations of the projective line ===
For a projective space of dimension one (a projective line; the projectivization of a vector space of dimension two), all points are collinear, so the collineation group is exactly the symmetric group of the points of the projective line. This is different from the behavior in higher dimensions, and thus one gives a more restrictive definition, specified so that the fundamental theorem of projective geometry holds.

In this definition, when V has dimension two, a collineation from PG(V) to PG(W) is a map α : D(V) → D(W), such that:

- The zero subspace of V is mapped to the zero subspace of W.
- V is mapped to W.
- There is a nonsingular semilinear map β from V to W such that, for all v in V,
  $$\alpha(\langle v\rangle)=\langle \beta(v)\rangle$$

This last requirement ensures that collineations are all semilinear maps.

== Types ==
The main examples of collineations are projective linear transformations (also known as homographies) and automorphic collineations. For projective spaces coming from a linear space, the fundamental theorem of projective geometry states that all collineations are a combination of these, as described below.

=== Projective linear transformations ===
Projective linear transformations (homographies) are collineations (planes in a vector space correspond to lines in the associated projective space, and linear transformations map planes to planes, so projective linear transformations map lines to lines), but in general not all collineations are projective linear transformations. The group of projective linear transformations (PGL) is in general a proper subgroup of the collineation group.

=== Automorphic collineations ===
An automorphic collineation is a map that, in coordinates, is a field automorphism applied to the coordinates.

== Fundamental theorem of projective geometry ==
If the geometric dimension of a pappian projective space is at least 2, then every collineation is the product of a homography (a projective linear transformation) and an automorphic collineation. More precisely, the collineation group is the projective semilinear group, which is the semidirect product of homographies by automorphic collineations: PΓL ≅ PGL ⋊ Gal(K/k), where k is the prime field of K.

In particular, the collineations of the real projective plane PG(2, R) are exactly the homographies, as R has no non-trivial automorphisms (see Automorphism#Examples and footnote d in Real number).

Suppose φ is a nonsingular semilinear map from V to W, with the dimension of V at least three. Define α : D(V) → D(W) by saying that Z^{α} = {φ(z) : z ∈ Z} for all Z in D(V). As φ is semilinear, one easily checks that this map is properly defined, and furthermore, as φ is not singular, it is bijective. It is obvious now that α is a collineation. We say that α is induced by φ.

The fundamental theorem of projective geometry states the converse:

Suppose V is a vector space over a field K with dimension at least three, W is a vector space over a field L, and α is a collineation from PG(V) to PG(W). This implies K and L are isomorphic fields, V and W have the same dimension, and there is a semilinear map φ such that φ induces α.

=== Linear structure ===
Thus for K a prime field ($\mathbb{F}_p$ or $\mathbb{Q}$), we have PGL = PΓL, but for K not a prime field (such as $\mathbb{C}$ or $\mathbb{F}_{p^n}$ for n ≥ 2), the projective linear group is in general a proper subgroup of the collineation group, which can be thought of as "transformations preserving a projective semi-linear structure". Correspondingly, the quotient group PΓL / PGL ≅ Gal(K/k) corresponds to "choices of linear structure", with the identity (base point) being the existing linear structure. Given a projective space without an identification as the projectivization of a linear space, there is no natural isomorphism between the collineation group and PΓL, and the choice of a linear structure (realization as projectivization of a linear space) corresponds to a choice of subgroup PGL < PΓL, these choices forming a torsor over Gal(K/k).

== History ==
The idea of a line was abstracted to a ternary relation determined by collinearity (points lying on a single line). According to Wilhelm Blaschke it was August Möbius that first abstracted this essence of geometrical transformation:

What do our geometric transformations mean now? Möbius threw out and fielded this question already in his Barycentric Calculus (1827). There he spoke not of transformations but of permutations [Verwandtschaften], when he said two elements drawn from a domain were permuted when they were interchanged by an arbitrary equation. In our particular case, linear equations between homogeneous point coordinates, Möbius called a permutation [Verwandtschaft] of both point spaces in particular a collineation. This signification would be changed later by Chasles to homography. Möbius’ expression is immediately comprehended when we follow Möbius in calling points collinear when they lie on the same line. Möbius' designation can be expressed by saying, collinear points are mapped by a permutation to collinear points, or in plain speech, straight lines stay straight.

Contemporary mathematicians view geometry as an incidence structure with an automorphism group consisting of mappings of the underlying space that preserve incidence. Such a mapping permutes the lines of the incidence structure, and the notion of collineation persists.

As mentioned by Blaschke and Klein, Michel Chasles preferred the term homography to collineation. A distinction between the terms arose when the distinction was clarified between the real projective plane and the complex projective line. Since there are no non-trivial field automorphisms of the real number field, all the collineations are homographies in the real projective plane, however due to the field automorphism of complex conjugation, not all collineations of the complex projective line are homographies. In applications such as computer vision where the underlying field is the real number field, homography and collineation can be used interchangeably.

== Anti-homography ==
The operation of taking the complex conjugate in the complex plane amounts to a reflection in the real line. With the notation z^{∗} for the conjugate of z, an anti-homography is given by

$$f(z) = \frac {a z^* + b}{c z^* + d}.$$

Thus an anti-homography is the composition of conjugation with a homography, and so is an example of a collineation which is not an homography. For example, geometrically, the mapping $f(z) = 1/z^*$ amounts to circle inversion. The transformations of inversive geometry of the plane are frequently described as the collection of all homographies and anti-homographies of the complex plane.
