= Division ring =

Algebraic structure also called skew field

In algebra, a division ring, also called a skew field, is a nontrivial ring in which division by nonzero elements is defined. Specifically, it is a nontrivial ring (Note: In this article, rings have a 1.) in which every nonzero element a has a multiplicative inverse; that is, an element usually denoted a^{–1}, such that a a^{–1} = a^{–1} a = 1. So, (right) division may be defined as a / b = a b^{–1}, but this notation is avoided, as one may have a b^{–1} ≠ b^{–1} a.

A commutative division ring is a field. Wedderburn's little theorem asserts that all finite division rings are commutative and therefore finite fields.

Historically, division rings were sometimes referred to as fields, while fields were called "commutative fields". (Note: Within the English language area the terms "skew field" and "sfield" were mentioned 1948 by Neal McCoy as "sometimes used in the literature", and since 1965 skewfield has an entry in the OED. The German term Schiefkörper is documented, as a suggestion by van der Waerden, in a 1927 text by Emil Artin, and was used by Emmy Noether as lecture title in 1928.) In some languages, such as French, the word equivalent to "field" ("corps") is used for both commutative and noncommutative cases, and the distinction between the two cases is made by adding qualificatives such as "corps commutatif" (commutative field) or "corps gauche" (skew field).

All division rings are simple. That is, they have no two-sided ideal besides the zero ideal and itself.

== Relation to fields and linear algebra ==
All fields are division rings, and every non-field division ring is noncommutative. The best known example is the ring of quaternions. If one allows only rational instead of real coefficients in the constructions of the quaternions, one obtains another division ring. In general, if R is a ring and S is a simple module over R, then, by Schur's lemma, the endomorphism ring of S is a division ring; every division ring arises in this fashion from some simple module.

Much of linear algebra may be formulated, and remains correct, for modules over a division ring D instead of vector spaces over a field. Doing so, one must specify whether one is considering right or left modules, and some care is needed in properly distinguishing left and right in formulas. In particular, every module has a basis, and Gaussian elimination can be used. So, everything that can be defined with these tools works on division algebras. Matrices and their products are defined similarly.

Determinants are not defined over noncommutative division algebras. Most things that require this concept cannot be generalized to noncommutative division algebras, although generalizations such as quasideterminants allow some results to be recovered.

Working in coordinates, elements of a finite-dimensional right module can be represented by column vectors, which can be multiplied on the right by scalars, and on the left by matrices (representing linear maps); for elements of a finite-dimensional left module, row vectors must be used, which can be multiplied on the left by scalars, and on the right by matrices. The dual of a right module is a left module, and vice versa. The transpose of a matrix must be viewed as a matrix over the opposite division ring D^{op} in order for the rule (AB)^{T} = B^{T}A^{T} to remain valid.

Every module over a division ring is free; that is, it has a basis, and all bases of a module have the same number of elements. Linear maps between finite-dimensional modules over a division ring can be described by matrices; the fact that linear maps by definition commute with scalar multiplication is most conveniently represented in notation by writing them on the opposite side of vectors as scalars are. The Gaussian elimination algorithm remains applicable. The column rank of a matrix is the dimension of the right module generated by the columns, and the row rank is the dimension of the left module generated by the rows; the same proof as for the vector space case can be used to show that these ranks are the same and define the rank of a matrix.

Division rings are the only rings over which every module is free: a ring R is a division ring if and only if every R-module is free.

The center of a division ring is commutative and therefore a field. Every division ring is therefore a division algebra over its center. Division rings can be roughly classified according to whether or not they are finite dimensional or infinite dimensional over their centers. The former are called centrally finite and the latter centrally infinite. Every field is one dimensional over its center. The ring of Hamiltonian quaternions forms a four-dimensional algebra over its center, which is isomorphic to the real numbers.

== Examples ==
- As noted above, all fields are division rings.
- The quaternions form a noncommutative division ring.
- The subset of the quaternions a + bi + cj + dk, such that a, b, c, and d belong to a fixed subfield of the real numbers, is a noncommutative division ring. When this subfield is the field of rational numbers, this is the division ring of rational quaternions.
- Let $\sigma: \Complex \to \Complex$ be an automorphism of the field $\Complex$. Let $\Complex((z,\sigma))$ denote the ring of formal Laurent series with complex coefficients, wherein multiplication is defined as follows: instead of simply allowing coefficients to commute directly with the indeterminate $z$, for $\alpha\in\Complex$, define $z^i\alpha := \sigma^i(\alpha) z^i$ for each index $i\in\mathbb{Z}$. If $\sigma$ is a non-trivial automorphism of complex numbers (such as conjugation), then the resulting ring of Laurent series is a noncommutative division ring known as a skew Laurent series ring; if σ = id then it features the standard multiplication of formal series. This concept can be generalized to the ring of Laurent series over any fixed field $F$, given a nontrivial $F$-automorphism $\sigma$.

== Main theorems ==
Wedderburn's little theorem: All finite division rings are commutative and therefore finite fields. (Ernst Witt gave a simple proof.)

Frobenius theorem: The only finite-dimensional associative division algebras over the reals are the reals themselves, the complex numbers, and the quaternions.

== Related notions ==
Division rings used to be called "fields" in an older usage. In many languages, a word meaning "body" is used for division rings, in some languages designating either commutative or noncommutative division rings, while in others specifically designating commutative division rings (what we now call fields in English). A more complete comparison is found in the article on fields.

The name "skew field" has an interesting semantic feature: a modifier (here "skew") widens the scope of the base term (here "field"). Thus a field is a particular type of skew field, and not all skew fields are fields.

While division rings and algebras as discussed here are assumed to have associative multiplication, nonassociative division algebras such as the octonions are also of interest.

A near-field is an algebraic structure similar to a division ring, except that it has only one of the two distributive laws.

== See also ==
- Hua's identity
