= Plücker =

Plücker may refer to any of the following:

- Julius Plücker (1801–1868), German mathematician and physicist
- 29643 Plücker, a main-belt asteroid
- Plücker coordinates, a geometric coordinate system
- Plücker lines, an arrangement of lines on a conic section
- Plücker matrix, a type of geometric matrix

== See also ==
- Plucker
- Plucked
- Pluck (disambiguation)
- Plucking (disambiguation)
