= Chow variety =

In mathematics, particularly in the field of algebraic geometry, a Chow variety is an algebraic variety whose points correspond to effective algebraic cycles of fixed dimension and degree on a given projective space. More precisely, the Chow variety $\operatorname{Gr}(k,d,n)$ is the fine moduli variety parametrizing all effective algebraic cycles of dimension $k-1$ and degree $d$ in $\mathbb{P}^{n-1}$.

The Chow variety $\operatorname{Gr}(k,d,n)$ may be constructed via a Chow embedding into a sufficiently large projective space. This is a direct generalization of the construction of a Grassmannian variety via the Plücker embedding, as Grassmannians are the $d=1$ case of Chow varieties.

Chow varieties are distinct from Chow groups, which are the abelian group of all algebraic cycles on a variety (not necessarily projective space) up to rational equivalence. Both are named for Wei-Liang Chow (周煒良), a pioneer in the study of algebraic cycles.

== Background on algebraic cycles ==
If X is a closed subvariety of $\mathbb{P}^{n-1}$ of dimension $k-1$, the degree of X is the number of intersection points between X and a generic $(n-k)$-dimensional projective subspace of $\mathbb{P}^{n-1}$.

Degree is constant in families of subvarieties, except in certain degenerate limits. To see this, consider the following family parametrized by t.

$$X_t := V(x^2-tyz) \subset \mathbb{P}^{2}$$.

Whenever $t\neq0$, $X_t$ is a conic (an irreducible subvariety of degree 2), but $X_0$ degenerates to the line $x=0$ (which has degree 1). There are several approaches to reconciling this issue, but the simplest is to declare $X_0$ to be a line of multiplicity 2 (and more generally to attach multiplicities to subvarieties) using the language of algebraic cycles.

A $(k-1)$-dimensional algebraic cycle is a finite formal linear combination

$$X=\sum_{i} m_{i}X_{i}$$.

in which $X_{i}$s are $(k-1)$-dimensional irreducible closed subvarieties in $\mathbb{P}^{n-1}$, and $m_{i}$s are integers. An algebraic cycle is effective if each $m_i\geq0$. The degree of an algebraic cycle is defined to be

$$\deg(X):=\sum_{i} m_{i}\deg(X_{i})$$.

A homogeneous polynomial or homogeneous ideal in n-many variables defines an effective algebraic cycle in $\mathbb{P}^{n-1}$, in which the multiplicity of each irreducible component is the order of vanishing at that component. In the family of algebraic cycles defined by $x^2-tyz$, the $t=0$ cycle is 2 times the line $x=0$, which has degree 2. More generally, the degree of an algebraic cycle is constant in families, and so it makes sense to consider the moduli problem of effective algebraic cycles of fixed dimension and degree.

== Examples of Chow varieties ==
There are three special classes of Chow varieties with particularly simple constructions.

=== Degree 1: Subspaces ===
An effective algebraic cycle in $\mathbb{P}^{n-1}$ of dimension k-1 and degree 1 is the projectivization of a k-dimensional subspace of n-dimensional affine space. This gives an isomorphism to a Grassmannian variety:

$$\operatorname{Gr}(k,1,n) \simeq \operatorname{Gr}(k,n)$$

The latter space has a distinguished system of homogeneous coordinates, given by the Plücker coordinates.

=== Dimension 0: Points ===
An effective algebraic cycle in $\mathbb{P}^{n-1}$ of dimension 0 and degree d is an (unordered) d-tuple of points in $\mathbb{P}^{n-1}$, possibly with repetition. This gives an isomorphism to a symmetric power of $\mathbb{P}^{n-1}$:

$$\operatorname{Gr}(1,d,n) \simeq \operatorname{Sym}_d\mathbb{P}^{n-1}$$.

=== Codimension 1: Divisors ===
An effective algebraic cycle in $\mathbb{P}^{n-1}$ of codimension 1 and degree d can be defined by the vanishing of a single degree d polynomial in n-many variables, and this polynomial is unique up to rescaling. Letting $V_{d,n}$ denote the vector space of degree d polynomials in n-many variables, this gives an isomorphism to a projective space:

$$\operatorname{Gr}(n-1,d,n) \simeq \mathbb{P}V_{d,n}$$.

Note that the latter space has a distinguished system of homogeneous coordinates, which send a polynomial to the coefficient of a fixed monomial.

=== A non-trivial example ===
The Chow variety $\operatorname{Gr}(2,2,4)$ parametrizes dimension 1, degree 2 cycles in $\mathbb{P}^{3}$. This Chow variety has two irreducible components.

- The moduli of conics contained in a projective plane (and their degenerations).
- The moduli of pairs of lines.

These two 8-dimensional components intersect in the moduli of coplanar pairs of lines, which is the singular locus in $\operatorname{Gr}(2,2,4)$. This shows that, in contrast with the special cases above, Chow varieties need not be smooth or irreducible.

== The Chow embedding ==
Let X be an irreducible subvariety in $\mathbb{P}^{n-1}$ of dimension k-1 and degree d. By the definition of the degree, most $(n-k)$-dimensional projective subspaces of $\mathbb{P}^{n-1}$ intersect X in d-many points. By contrast, most $(n-k-1)$-dimensional projective subspaces of $\mathbb{P}^{n-1}$ do not intersect at X at all. This can be sharpened as follows.

Lemma. The set $Z(X) \subset \operatorname{Gr}(n-k,n)$ parametrizing the subspaces of $\mathbb{P}^{n-1}$ which intersect X non-trivially is an irreducible hypersurface of degree d.

As a consequence, there exists a degree d form $R_X$ on $\operatorname{Gr}(n-k,n)$ which vanishes precisely on $Z(X)$, and this form is unique up to scaling. This construction can be extended to an algebraic cycle $X=\sum_{i} m_{i}X_{i}$ by declaring that $R_X:= \prod_{i} R_{X_i}^{m_i}$. To each degree d algebraic cycle, this associates a degree d form $R_X$ on $\operatorname{Gr}(n-k,n)$, called the Chow form of X, which is well-defined up to scaling.

Let $V_{k,d,n}$ denote the vector space of degree d forms on $\operatorname{Gr}(n-k,n)$.

The Chow-van-der-Waerden Theorem. The map $\operatorname{Gr}(k,d,n) \hookrightarrow \mathbb{P}V_{k,d,n}$ which sends $X\mapsto R_X$ is a closed embedding of varieties.

In particular, an effective algebraic cycle X is determined by its Chow form $R_X$.

If a basis for $V_{k,d,n}$ has been chosen, sending $X$ to the coefficients of $R_X$ in this basis gives a system of homogeneous coordinates on the Chow variety $\operatorname{Gr}(k,d,n)$, called the Chow coordinates of $X$. However, as there is no consensus as to the ‘best’ basis for $V_{k,d,n}$, this term can be ambiguous.

From a foundational perspective, the above theorem is usually used as the definition of $\operatorname{Gr}(k,d,n)$. That is, the Chow variety is usually defined as a subvariety of $\mathbb{P}V_{k,d,n}$, and only then shown to be a fine moduli space for the moduli problem in question.

== Relation to the Hilbert scheme ==
A more sophisticated solution to the problem of 'correctly' counting the degree of a degenerate subvariety is to work with subschemes of $\mathbb{P}^{n-1}$ rather than subvarieties. Schemes can keep track of infinitesimal information that varieties and algebraic cycles cannot.

For example, if two points in a variety approach each other in an algebraic family, the limiting subvariety is a single point, the limiting algebraic cycle is a point with multiplicity 2, and the limiting subscheme is a 'fat point' which contains the tangent direction along which the two points collided.

The Hilbert scheme $\operatorname{Hilb}(k,d,n)$ is the fine moduli scheme of closed subschemes of dimension k-1 and degree d inside $\mathbb{P}^{n-1}$. Each closed subscheme determines an effective algebraic cycle, and the induced map

$$\operatorname{Hilb}(k,d,n) \longrightarrow \operatorname{Gr}(k,d,n)$$.

is called the cycle map or the Hilbert-Chow morphism. This map is generically an isomorphism over the points in $\operatorname{Gr}(k,d,n)$ corresponding to irreducible subvarieties of degree d, but the fibers over non-simple algebraic cycles can be more interesting.

== Chow quotient ==
A Chow quotient parametrizes closures of generic orbits. It is constructed as a closed subvariety of a Chow variety.

Kapranov's theorem says that the moduli space $\overline{M}_{0, n}$ of stable genus-zero curves with n marked points is the Chow quotient of Grassmannian $\operatorname{Gr}(2, \C^n)$ by the standard maximal torus.

== See also ==
- Picard variety
- GIT quotient
