= Bracket ring =

In mathematics invariant theory, the bracket ring is the subring of the ring of polynomials k[x_{11},...,x_{dn}] generated by the d-by-d minors of a generic d-by-n matrix (x_{ij}).

The bracket ring may be regarded as the ring of polynomials on the image of a Grassmannian under the Plücker embedding.

For given d ≤ n we define as formal variables the brackets [λ_{1} λ_{2} ... λ_{d}] with the λ taken from {1,...,n}, subject to [λ_{1} λ_{2} ... λ_{d}] = − [λ_{2} λ_{1} ... λ_{d}] and similarly for other transpositions. The set Λ(n,d) of size $\binom{n}{d}$ generates a polynomial ring K[Λ(n,d)] over a field K. There is a homomorphism Φ(n,d) from K[Λ(n,d)] to the polynomial ring K[x_{i,j}] in nd indeterminates given by mapping [λ_{1} λ_{2} ... λ_{d}] to the determinant of the d by d matrix consisting of the columns of the x_{i,j} indexed by the λ. The bracket ring B(n,d) is the image of Φ. The kernel I(n,d) of Φ encodes the relations or syzygies that exist between the minors of a generic n by d matrix. The projective variety defined by the ideal I is the (n−d)d dimensional Grassmann variety whose points correspond to d-dimensional subspaces of an n-dimensional space.

To compute with brackets it is necessary to determine when an expression lies in the ideal I(n,d). This is achieved by a straightening law due to Young (1928).

== See also ==
- Bracket algebra
