= Plücker matrix =

Skew-symmetric 4 × 4 matrix, which characterizes a straight line in projective space

In mathematics, the Plücker matrix is a special skew-symmetric 4 × 4 matrix, which characterizes a straight line in projective space. The matrix is defined by 6 Plücker coordinates with 4 degrees of freedom. It is named after the German mathematician Julius Plücker.

== Definition ==
A straight line in space is defined by two distinct points $A = \left(A_0, A_1, A_2, A_3\right)^\top \in \mathbb{R}\mathcal{P}^3$ and $B = \left(B_0, B_1, B_2, B_3\right)^\top \in \mathbb{R}\mathcal{P}^3$ in homogeneous coordinates of the projective space. Its Plücker matrix is:

$$[\mathbf{L}]_{\times} \propto \mathbf{A}\mathbf{B}^{\top} - \mathbf{B}\mathbf{A}^{\top} =
\left(\begin{array}{cccc}
0 & -L_{01} & -L_{02} & -L_{03} \\
L_{01} &       0 & -L_{12} & -L_{13} \\
L_{02} &  L_{12} &       0 & -L_{23} \\
L_{03} &  L_{13} &  L_{23} &       0
\end{array}\right)$$

Where the skew-symmetric $4\times 4$-matrix is defined by the 6 Plücker coordinates

$$\mathbf{L}\propto(L_{01}, L_{02}, L_{03}, L_{12}, L_{13}, L_{23})^\top$$

with

$$L_{ij} = A_iB_j - B_iA_j.$$

Plücker coordinates fulfil the Grassmann–Plücker relations

$$L_{01} L_{23} - L_{02} L_{13} + L_{03} L_{12} = 0$$

and are defined up to scale. A Plücker matrix has only rank 2 and four degrees of freedom (just like lines in $\mathbb{R}^3$). They are independent of a particular choice of the points $\mathbf{A}$ and $\mathbf{B}$ and can be seen as a generalization of the line equation i.e. of the cross product for both the intersection (meet) of two lines, as well as the joining line of two points in the projective plane.

== Properties ==
The Plücker matrix allows us to express the following geometric operations as matrix-vector product:

- Plane contains line: $\mathbf{0} = [\mathbf{L}]_{\times}\mathbf{E}$
- $\mathbf{X} = [\mathbf{L}]_{\times}\mathbf{E}$ is the point of intersection of the line $\mathbf{L}$ and the plane $\mathbf{E}$ ('Meet')
- Point lies on line: $\mathbf{0} = [\tilde{\mathbf{L}}]_{\times}\mathbf{X}$
- $\mathbf{E} = [\tilde{\mathbf{L}}]_{\times}\mathbf{X}$ is the common plane $\mathbf{E}$, which contains both the point $\mathbf{X}$ and the line $\mathbf{L}$ ('Join').
- Direction of a line: $[\mathbf{L}]_{\times}\pi^\infty = [\mathbf{L}]_{\times}(0, 0, 0, 1)^\top = \left(-L_{03}, -L_{13}, -L_{23}, 0\right)^\top$ (Note: The latter can be interpreted as a plane orthogonal to the line passing through the coordinate origin)
- Closest point to the origin $\mathbf{X}_{0} \cong [\mathbf{L}]_{\times}[\mathbf{L}]_{\times}\pi^{\infty}.$

== Uniqueness ==
Two arbitrary distinct points on the line can be written as a linear combination of $\mathbf{A}$ and $\mathbf{B}$:

$$\mathbf{A}^{\prime} \propto \mathbf{A}\alpha + \mathbf{B}\beta\text{ and } \mathbf{B}^\prime \propto\mathbf{A}\gamma + \mathbf{B}\delta.$$

Their Plücker matrix is thus:

$$\begin{align}
{[}\mathbf{L}^\prime{]}_\times
&= \mathbf{A}^\prime\mathbf{B}^\prime - \mathbf{B}^\prime \mathbf{A}^\prime \\[6pt]
&= (\mathbf{A}\alpha + \mathbf{B}\beta)(\mathbf{A}\gamma + \mathbf{B}\delta)^\top - (\mathbf{A}\gamma + \mathbf{B}\delta)(\mathbf{A}\alpha + \mathbf{B}\beta)^\top \\[6pt]
&= \underbrace{(\alpha\delta - \beta\gamma)}_\lambda[\mathbf{L}]_\times,
\end{align}$$

up to scale identical to $[\mathbf{L}]_{\times}$.

== Intersection with a plane ==
The meet of a plane and a line in projective three-space as expressed by multiplication with the Plücker matrix

Let $\mathbf{E} = \left(E_{0}, E_{1}, E_{2}, E_{3}\right)^{\top} \in \mathbb{R}\mathcal{P}^{3}$ denote the plane with the equation

$$E_{0}x + E_{1}y + E_{2}z + E_{3} = 0.$$

which does not contain the line $\mathbf{L}$. Then, the matrix-vector product with the Plücker matrix describes a point

$$\mathbf{X} = [\mathbf{L}]_{\times}\mathbf{E}
= \mathbf{A}\underset{\alpha}{\underbrace{\mathbf{B}^{\top}\mathbf{E}}} - \mathbf{B}\underset{\beta}{\underbrace{\mathbf{A}^{\top}\mathbf{E}}}
= \mathbf{A}\alpha + \mathbf{B}\beta,$$

which lies on the line $\mathbf{L}$ because it is a linear combination of $\mathbf{A}$ and $\mathbf{B}$. $\mathbf{X}$ is also contained in the plane $\mathbf{E}$

$$\mathbf{E}^{\top}\mathbf{X}
= \mathbf{E}^{\top}[\mathbf{L}]_{\times}\mathbf{E}
= \underset{\alpha}{\underbrace{\mathbf{E}^{\top}\mathbf{A}}}\underset{\beta}{\underbrace{\mathbf{B}^{\top}\mathbf{E}}} - \underset{\beta}{\underbrace{\mathbf{E}^{\top}\mathbf{B}}}\underset{\alpha}{\underbrace{\mathbf{A}^{\top}\mathbf{E}}}
= 0,$$

and must therefore be their point of intersection.

In addition, the product of the Plücker matrix with a plane is the zero-vector, exactly if the line $\mathbf{L}$ is contained entirely in the plane:

$\alpha = \beta = 0 \iff \mathbf{E}$ contains $\mathbf{L}.$

== Dual Plücker matrix ==
The join of a point and a line in projective three-space as expressed by multiplication with the Plücker matrix

In projective three-space, both points and planes have the same representation as 4-vectors and the algebraic description of their geometric relationship (point lies on plane) is symmetric. By interchanging the terms plane and point in a theorem, one obtains a dual theorem which is also true.

In case of the Plücker matrix, there exists a dual representation of the line in space as the intersection of two planes:

$$E = \left(E_0, E_1, E_2, E_3\right)^\top \in \mathbb{R}\mathcal{P}^3$$

and

$$F = \left(F_0, F_1, F_2, F_3\right)^\top \in \mathbb{R}\mathcal{P}^3$$

in homogeneous coordinates of projective space. Their Plücker matrix is:

$$\left[\tilde{\mathbf{L}}\right]_{\times} = \mathbf{E}\mathbf{F}^{\top} - \mathbf{F}\mathbf{E}^{\top}$$

and

$$\mathbf{G} = \left[\tilde{\mathbf{L}}\right]_{\times}\mathbf{X}$$

describes the plane $\mathbf{G}$ which contains both the point $\mathbf{X}$ and the line $\mathbf{L}$.

== Relationship between primal and dual Plücker matrices ==
As the vector $\mathbf{X} = [\mathbf{L}]_{\times}\mathbf{E}$, with an arbitrary plane $\mathbf{E}$, is either the zero-vector or a point on the line, it follows:

$$\forall\mathbf{E} \in \mathbb{R}\mathcal{P}^{3}:\,
\mathbf{X} = [\mathbf{L}]_{\times}\mathbf{E}\text{ lies on }\mathbf{L}
\iff \left[\tilde{\mathbf{L}}\right]_{\times}\mathbf{X} = \mathbf{0}.$$

Thus:

$$\left([\tilde{\mathbf{L}}]_{\times}[\mathbf{L}]_{\times}\right)^{\top}
= [\mathbf{L}]_{\times}\left[\tilde{\mathbf{L}}\right]_{\times}
= \mathbf{0} \in \mathbb{R}^{4\times 4}.$$

The following product fulfills these properties:

$$\begin{align}
&\left(\begin{array}{cccc}
0 &  L_{23} & -L_{13} &  L_{12} \\
-L_{23} &       0 &  L_{03} & -L_{02} \\
L_{13} & -L_{03} &       0 &  L_{01} \\
-L_{12} &  L_{02} & -L_{01} & 0
\end{array}\right)
\left(\begin{array}{cccc}
0 & -L_{01} & -L_{02} & -L_{03} \\
L_{01} &       0 & -L_{12} & -L_{13} \\
L_{02} &  L_{12} &       0 & -L_{23} \\
L_{03} &  L_{13} &  L_{23} &       0
\end{array}\right) \\[10pt]
={} &\left(L_{01}L_{23} - L_{02}L_{13} + L_{03}L_{12}\right) \cdot
\left(\begin{array}{cccc}
1 & 0 & 0 & 0 \\
0 & 1 & 0 & 0 \\
0 & 0 & 1 & 0 \\
0 & 0 & 0 & 1
\end{array}\right)
=    \mathbf{0},
\end{align}$$

due to the Grassmann–Plücker relation. With the uniqueness of Plücker matrices up to scalar multiples, for the primal Plücker coordinates

$$\mathbf{L} = \left(L_{01},\,L_{02},\,L_{03},\,L_{12},\,L_{13},\,L_{23}\right)^{\top}$$

we obtain the following dual Plücker coordinates:

$$\tilde{\mathbf{L}} = \left(L_{23},\,-L_{13},\,L_{12},\,L_{03},\,-L_{02},\,L_{01}\right)^{\top}.$$

== In the projective plane ==
Duality of join and meet operations in two-space.

The 'join' of two points in the projective plane is the operation of connecting two points with a straight line. Its line equation can be computed using the cross product:

$$\mathbf{l} \propto \mathbf{a} \times \mathbf{b} =
\left(\begin{array}{c}
a_{1}b_{2} - b_{1}a_{2} \\
b_{0}a_{2} - a_{0}b_{2} \\
a_{0}b_{1} - a_{1}b_{0}
\end{array}\right) = \left(\begin{array}{c}
l_{0} \\
l_{1} \\
l_{2}
\end{array}\right).$$

Dually, one can express the 'meet', or intersection of two straight lines by the cross-product:

$$\mathbf{x} \propto \mathbf{l} \times \mathbf{m}$$

The relationship to Plücker matrices becomes evident, if one writes the cross product as a matrix-vector product with a skew-symmetric matrix:

$$[\mathbf{l}]_{\times} =
\mathbf{a}\mathbf{b}^{\top} - \mathbf{b}\mathbf{a}^{\top} =
\left(\begin{array}{ccc}
0 &  l_{2} & -l_{1} \\
-l_{2} &      0 &  l_{0} \\
l_{1} & -l_{0} &      0
\end{array}\right)$$

and analogously $[\mathbf{x}]_{\times} = \mathbf{l}\mathbf{m}^{\top} - \mathbf{m}\mathbf{l}^{\top}$

== Geometric interpretation ==
Let $\mathbf{d} = \left(-L_{03},\, -L_{13},\, -L_{23}\right)^{\top}$ and $\mathbf{m} = \left(L_{12},\, -L_{02},\, L_{01}\right)^{\top}$, then we can write

$$[\mathbf{L}]_{\times} = \left(\begin{array}{cc}
[\mathbf{m}]_{\times} & \mathbf{d} \\
-\mathbf{d} &          0
\end{array}\right)$$

and

$[\tilde{\mathbf{L}}]_{\times} = \left(\begin{array}{cc} [-\mathbf{d}]_{\times} & \mathbf{m}\\ -\mathbf{m} & 0 \end{array}\right),$

where $\mathbf{d}$ is the displacement and $\mathbf{m}$ is the moment of the line, compare the geometric intuition of Plücker coordinates.
