= Plücker surface =

Algebraic geometry surface, studied by Julius Plücker (1899)

In algebraic geometry, a Plücker surface, studied by Julius Plücker (1899), is a quartic surface in 3-dimensional projective space with a double line and 8 nodes.

== Construction ==
For any quadric line complex, the lines of the complex in a plane envelop a quadric in the plane. A Plücker surface depends on the choice of a quadric line complex and a line, and consists of points of the quadrics associated to the planes through the chosen line.
