= Christian Ludwig Gerling =

German astronomer (1788–1864)

Christian Gerling
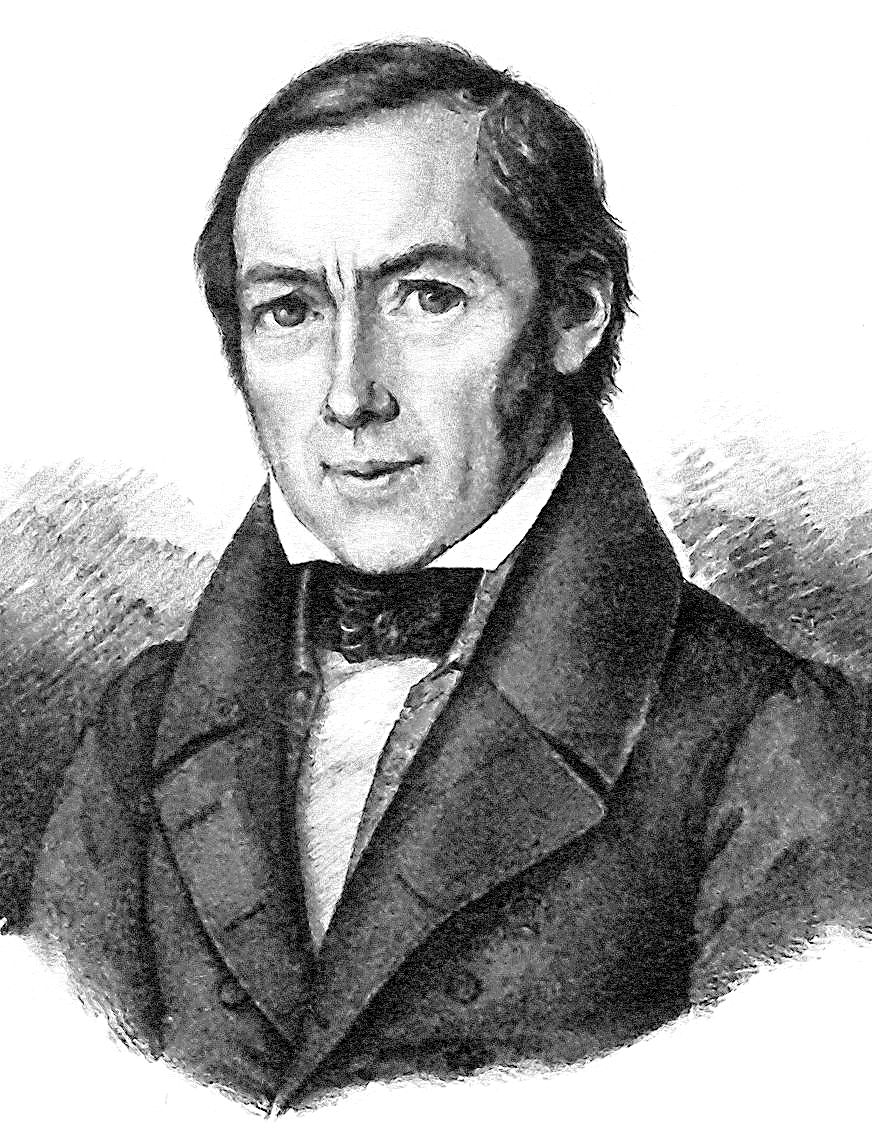
- Christian Ludwig Gerling (1788-1864)
- Born: 10 July 1788; Hamburg
- Died: 15 January 1864 (aged 75); Marburg
- Education: University of Göttingen
- Known for: Geodetic triangulations
- Scientific career
- Fields: Physicist and astronomer
- Workplaces: University of Marburg
- Doctoral advisor: Carl Friedrich Gauss
- Doctoral students: Julius Plücker

Christian Ludwig Gerling (10 July 1788 – 15 January 1864) studied under Carl Friedrich Gauss, obtaining his doctorate in 1812 for his thesis Methodi proiectionis orthographicae usum ad calculos parallacticos facilitandos explicavit simulque eclipsin solarem die at the University of Göttingen. He is notable for his work on geodetics, and in 1927 some 60 letters of correspondence between Gerling and Gauss on the topic were published. He is also notable as the doctoral advisor of Julius Plücker.

Gerling, whose father was also called Christian Ludwig Gerling and was a pastor at the St. James's Church, was born in Hamburg and attended the Johanneum. In 1817, he became a professor of mathematics at the University of Marburg.
