= Plucky =

Plucky may refer to:

- Plucky Duck, a fictional anthropomorphic green duck in the animated series Tiny Toon Adventures

== See also ==
- Plucking (disambiguation)
