= Grassmannian =

Mathematical space

In mathematics, a Grassmannian $\mathbf{Gr}_k(V)$, also known as a Grassmann manifold, is a differentiable manifold that parameterizes the set of all $k$-dimensional linear subspaces of an $n$-dimensional vector space $V$ over a field $K$ that has a differentiable structure. For example, the Grassmannian $\mathbf{Gr}_1(V)$ is the space of lines through the origin in $V$, so it is the same as the projective space $\mathbf{P}(V)$ of one dimension lower than $V$. When $V$ is a real or complex vector space, Grassmannians are compact smooth manifolds, of dimension $k(n-k)$. In general they have the structure of a nonsingular projective algebraic variety. The Grassmannian is named for the German polymath, linguist and mathematician Hermann Grassmann, who introduced the concept to mathematics.

== History ==
The earliest work on a non-trivial Grassmannian was by Julius Plücker, who studied the set of projective lines in real projective 3-space, which is equivalent to $\mathbf{Gr}_2(\mathbf{R}^4)$, parameterizing them by what are now called Plücker coordinates. Hermann Grassmann later generalized the concept.

Notations for Grassmannians vary between authors; they include $\mathbf{Gr}_k(V)$, $\mathbf{Gr}(k,V)$,$\mathbf{Gr}_k(n)$, $\mathbf{Gr}(k,n)$ to denote the Grassmannian of $k$-dimensional subspaces of an $n$-dimensional vector space $V$.

== Motivation ==
By giving a collection of subspaces of a vector space a topological structure, it is possible to talk about a continuous choice of subspaces or open and closed collections of subspaces. Giving them the further structure of a differentiable manifold enables smooth choices of subspace.

A natural example comes from tangent bundles of smooth manifolds embedded in a Euclidean space. Given a manifold $M$ of dimension $k$ embedded in $\mathbf{R}^n$. At each point $x\in M$, the tangent space to $M$ can be considered as a subspace of the tangent space of $\mathbf{R}^n$, which is also just $\mathbf{R}^n$. The map assigning to $x$ its tangent space defines a map from M to $\mathbf{Gr}_k(\mathbf{R}^n)$. (In order to do this, the tangent space at each $x \in M$ must be translated so that it passes through the origin rather than $x$, and hence defines a $k$-dimensional vector subspace. This idea is similar to the Gauss map for surfaces in a 3-dimensional space.)

This can be extended to all vector bundles over a manifold $M$, so that every vector bundle generates a continuous map from $M$ to a suitably generalised Grassmannian—although various embedding theorems must be proved to show this. The properties of vector bundles are thus related to the properties of the corresponding maps. In particular vector bundles inducing homotopic maps to the Grassmannian are isomorphic. Here the definition of homotopy relies on a notion of continuity, and hence a topology.

== Low dimensions ==
For k = 1, the Grassmannian Gr(1, n) is the space of lines through the origin in n-space, so it is the same as the projective space $\mathbf{P}^{n-1}$ of n − 1 dimensions.

For k = 2, the Grassmannian is the space of all 2-dimensional planes containing the origin. In Euclidean 3-space, a plane containing the origin is completely characterized by the single line through the origin that is perpendicular to that plane (and vice versa); hence the spaces Gr(2, 3), Gr(1, 3), and P^{2} (the projective plane) may all be identified with each other.

The simplest Grassmannian that is not a projective space is Gr(2, 4).

== Differentiable manifold ==
To endow $\mathbf{Gr}_k(V)$ with the structure of a differentiable manifold, a basis for $V$ must be chosen. This is equivalent to identifying $V$ with $K^n$, with the standard basis denoted $(e_1, \dots, e_n)$, viewed as column vectors. Then for any $k$-dimensional subspace $w\subset V$, viewed as an element of $\mathbf{Gr}_k(V)$, a basis can be found consisting of $k$ linearly independent column vectors $(W_1, \dots, W_k)$. The homogeneous coordinates of the element $w \in \mathbf{Gr}_k(V)$ consist of the elements of the $n\times k$ maximal rank rectangular matrix $W$ whose $i$-th column vector is $W_i$, $i = 1, \dots, k$. Since the choice of basis is arbitrary, two such maximal rank rectangular matrices $W$ and $\tilde{W}$ represent the same element $w \in \mathbf{Gr}_k(V)$ if and only if

$$\tilde{W} = W g$$

for some element $g \in GL(k, K)$ of the general linear group of invertible $k\times k$ matrices with entries in $K$. This defines an equivalence relation between $n\times k$ matrices $W$ of rank $k$, for which the equivalence classes are denoted $[W]$.

A coordinate atlas ensures that for any $n \times k$ homogeneous coordinate matrix $W$, elementary column operations can be applied (essentially multiplying $W$ by a sequence of elements $g \in GL(k, K)$) to obtain its reduced column echelon form. If the first $k$ rows of $W$ are linearly independent, the result has the form

$$\begin{bmatrix} 1 \\ & 1 \\ & & \ddots \\ & & & 1 \\ a_{1,1} & \cdots & \cdots & a_{1,k} \\ \vdots & & & \vdots \\ a_{n-k,1} & \cdots & \cdots & a_{n-k,k} \end{bmatrix}$$

and the $(n-k)\times k$ affine coordinate matrix $A$ with entries $(a_{ij})$ determines $w$. In general, the first $k$ rows need not be independent, but since $W$ has maximal rank $k$, an ordered set of integers $1 \le i_1 < \cdots < i_k \le n$ exists such that the $k \times k$ submatrix $W_{i_1, \dots, i_k}$ whose rows are the $(i_1, \ldots, i_k)$-th rows of $W$ is nonsingular. Column operations can reduce this submatrix to the identity matrix, and the remaining entries uniquely determine $w$. This gives the following definition:

For each ordered set of integers $1 \le i_1 < \cdots < i_k \le n$, let $U_{i_1, \dots, i_k}$ a set of elements $w\in \mathbf{Gr}_k(V)$ exists for which, for any choice of homogeneous coordinate matrix $W$, the $k\times k$ submatrix $W_{i_1, \dots, i_k}$ whose $j$-th row is the $i_j$-th row of $W$ is nonsingular. The affine coordinate functions on $U_{i_1, \dots, i_k}$ are then defined as the entries of the $(n-k)\times k$ matrix $A^{i_1, \dots, i_k}$ whose rows are those of the matrix $W W^{-1}_{i_1, \dots, i_k}$ complementary to $(i_1, \dots, i_k)$, written in the same order. The choice of homogeneous $n \times k$ coordinate matrix $W$ in $[W]$ representing the element $w\in \mathbf{Gr}_k(V)$ does not affect the values of the affine coordinate matrix $A^{i_1, \dots, i_k}$ representing w on the coordinate neighbourhood $U_{i_1, \dots, i_k}$. Moreover, the coordinate matrices $A^{i_1, \dots, i_k}$ may take arbitrary values, and they define a diffeomorphism from $U_{i_1, \dots, i_k}$ to the space of $K$-valued $(n-k)\times k$ matrices. This can be denoted by

$$\hat{A}^{i_1, \dots, i_k} := W (W_{i_1, \dots , i_k})^{-1}$$

the homogeneous coordinate matrix having the identity matrix as the $k \times k$ submatrix with rows $(i_1, \dots, i_k)$ and the affine coordinate matrix $A^{i_1, \dots, i_k}$ in the consecutive complementary rows. On the overlap $U_{i_1, \dots, i_k} \cap U_{j_1, \dots, j_k}$ between any two such coordinate neighborhoods, the affine coordinate matrix values $A^{i_1, \dots, i_k}$ and $A^{j_1, \dots, j_k}$ are related by the transition relations

$$\hat{A}^{i_1, \dots, i_k} W_{i_1, \dots, i_k} = \hat{A}^{j_1, \dots, j_k} W_{j_1, \dots, j_k},$$

where both $W_{i_1, \dots, i_k}$ and $W_{j_1, \dots, j_k}$ are invertible. This may equivalently be written as

$$\hat{A}^{j_1, \dots, j_k} = \hat{A}^{i_1, \dots, i_k} (\hat{A}^{i_1, \dots, i_k}_{j_1, \dots, j_k})^{-1},$$

where $\hat{A}^{i_1, \dots, i_k}_{j_1, \dots, j_k}$ is the invertible $k \times k$ matrix whose $l$th row is the $j_l$th row of $\hat{A}^{i_1, \dots, i_k}$. The transition functions are therefore rational in the matrix elements of $A^{i_1, \dots, i_k}$, and $\{U_{i_1, \dots, i_k}, A^{i_1, \dots, i_k}\}$ gives an atlas for $\mathbf{Gr}_k(V)$ as a differentiable manifold and also as an algebraic variety.

== Orthogonal projections ==
An alternative way to define a real or complex Grassmannian as a manifold is to view it as a set of orthogonal projection operators. For this, a positive definite real or Hermitian inner product $\langle \cdot , \cdot \rangle$ on $V$ can be chosen, depending on whether $V$ is real or complex. A $k$-dimensional subspace $w$ determines a unique orthogonal projection operator $P_w:V\rightarrow V$ whose image is $w\subset V$ by splitting $V$ into the orthogonal direct sum

$$V = w \oplus w^\perp$$

of $w$ and its orthogonal complement $w^\perp$ and defining

$$P_w(v) =\begin{cases} v \quad \text{ if } v \in w \\
0 \quad \text{ if } v\in w^\perp .
\end{cases}$$

Conversely, every projection operator $P$ of rank $k$ defines a subspace $w_P := \mathrm{Im}(P)$ as its image. Since the rank of an orthogonal projection operator equals its trace, we can identify the Grassmann manifold $\mathbf{Gr}(k, V)$ with the set of rank $k$ orthogonal projection operators $P$:

$$\mathbf{Gr}(k, V) \sim \left\{ P \in \mathrm{End}(V) \mid P = P^2 = P^\dagger,\, \mathrm{tr}(P) = k \right\}.$$

In particular, taking $V = \mathbf{R}^n$ or $V = \mathbf{C}^n$ gives completely explicit equations for embedding the Grassmannians $\mathbf{Gr}(k, \mathbf{R}^N)$, $\mathbf{Gr}(k, \mathbf{C}^N)$ in the space of real or complex $n\times n$ matrices $\mathbf{R}^{n \times n}$, $\mathbf{C}^{n \times n}$, respectively.

Since this defines the Grassmannian as a closed subset of the sphere $\{X \in \mathrm{End}(V) \mid \mathrm{tr}(XX^\dagger) = k\}$ the Grassmannian is a compact Hausdorff space. This construction also turns the Grassmannian $\mathbf{Gr}(k, V)$ into a metric space with metric

$$d(w, w') := \lVert P_w - P_{w'} \rVert,$$

for any pair $w, w' \subset V$ of $k$-dimensional subspaces, where ‖⋅‖ denotes the operator norm. The exact inner product used does not matter, because a different inner product gives an equivalent norm on $V$, and hence an equivalent metric.

For the case of real or complex Grassmannians, the following is an equivalent way to express the above construction in terms of matrices.

== Affine algebraic varieties ==
Let $M(n, \mathbf{R})$ denote the space of real $n \times n$ matrices and the subset $P(k, n, \mathbf{R})\subset M(n, \mathbf{R})$ of matrices $P \in M(n, \mathbf{R})$ that satisfy the three conditions:

- $P$ is a projection operator: $P^2=P$.
- $P$ is symmetric: $P^T=P$.
- $P$ has trace $\operatorname{tr}(P)=k$.

A bijective correspondence exists between $P(k, n, \mathbf{R})$ and the Grassmannian $\mathbf{Gr}(k, \mathbf{R}^n)$ of $k$-dimensional subspaces of $\mathbf{R}^n$ given by sending $P\in P(k, n, \mathbf{R})$ to the $k$-dimensional subspace of $\mathbf{R}^n$ spanned by its columns and, conversely, sending any element $w\in\mathbf{Gr}(k, \mathbf{R}^n)$ to the projection matrix

$$P_w:= \sum_{i=1}^k w_i w_i^T,$$

where $(w_1, \cdots, w_k)$ is any orthonormal basis for $w\subset\mathbf{R}^n$, viewed as real $n$ component column vectors.

An analogous construction applies to the complex Grassmannian $\mathbf{Gr}(k, \mathbf{C}^n)$, identifying it bijectively with the subset $P(k, n, \mathbf{C})\subset M(n,\mathbf{C})$ of complex $n \times n$ matrices $P\in M(n,\mathbf{C})$ satisfying

- $P$ is a projection operator: $P^2=P$.
- $P$ is self-adjoint (Hermitian): $P^\dagger=P$.
- $P$ has trace $\operatorname{tr}(P)=k$,

where the self-adjointness is with respect to the Hermitian inner product $\langle \, \cdot, \cdot \, \rangle$ in which the standard basis vectors $(e_1, \cdots, e_n)$ are orthonomal. The formula for the orthogonal projection matrix $P_w$ onto the complex $k$-dimensional subspace $w\subset \mathbf{C}^n$ spanned by the orthonormal (unitary) basis vectors $(w_1, \cdots, w_k)$ is

$$P_w:= \sum_{i=1}^k w_i w_i^\dagger.$$

== Homogeneous space ==
The quickest way of giving the Grassmannian a geometric structure is to express it as a homogeneous space. The general linear group $\mathrm{GL}(V)$ acts transitively on the $k$-dimensional subspaces of $V$. Therefore, by choosing a subspace $w_0 \subset V$ of dimension $k$, any element $w\in\mathbf{Gr}(k, V)$ can be expressed as

$$w = g (w_0)$$

for some group element $g \in \mathrm{GL}(V)$, where $g$ is determined only up to right multiplication by elements $\{h \in H\}$ of the stabilizer of $w_0$:

$$H:=\mathrm{stab}(w_0):=\{h\in \mathrm{GL}(V) \,|\, h(w_0)=w_0 \} \subset \mathrm{GL}(V)$$

under the $\mathrm{GL}(V)$-action.

$\mathbf{Gr}(k, V)$ can be identified with the quotient space

$$\mathbf{Gr}(k, V) = \mathrm{GL}(V)/H$$

of left cosets of $H$.

If the underlying field $\mathbf{R}$ or $\mathbf{C}$ and $\mathrm{GL}(V)$ is considered as a Lie group, this construction makes the Grassmannian a smooth manifold under the quotient structure. More generally, over a ground field $K$, the group $\mathrm{GL}(V)$ is an algebraic group, and this construction shows that the Grassmannian is a non-singular algebraic variety. It follows from the existence of the Plücker embedding that the Grassmannian is complete as an algebraic variety. In particular, $H$ is a parabolic subgroup of $\mathrm{GL}(V)$.

Over $\mathbf{R}$ or $\mathbf{C}$ it becomes possible to use smaller groups in this construction. To do this over $\mathbf{R}$, a Euclidean inner product can be fixed $q$ on $V$. The real orthogonal group $O(V, q)$ acts transitively on the set of $k$-dimensional subspaces $\mathbf{Gr}(k, V)$ and the stabiliser of a $k$-space $w_0\subset V$ is

$$O(w_0, q|_{w_0})\times O(w^\perp_0, q|_{w^\perp_0})$$,

where $w_0^\perp$ is the orthogonal complement of $w_0$ in $V$. This gives an identification as the homogeneous space

$$\mathbf{Gr}(k, V) = O(V, q)/\left(O(w, q|_w)\times O(w^\perp, q|_{w^\perp})\right)$$.

taking $V = \mathbf{R}^n$ and $w_0 = \mathbf{R}^k \subset \mathbf{R}^n$ (the first $k$ components) gives the isomorphism

$$\mathbf{Gr}(k,\mathbf{R}^n) = O(n)/\left(O(k) \times O(n - k)\right).$$

Over C, choosing an Hermitian inner product $h$ let the unitary group $U(V, h)$ act transitively, and analogously

$$\mathbf{Gr}(k, V) = U(V , h)/\left(U(w_0, h|_{w_0}) \times U(w_0^\perp|, h_{w_0^\perp})\right),$$

or, for $V = \mathbf{C}^n$ and $w_0 = \mathbf{C}^k \subset \mathbf{C}^n$,

$$\mathbf{Gr}(k, \mathbf{C}^n) = U(n)/\left(U(k) \times U(n-k)\right).$$

In particular, this shows that the Grassmannian is compact, and of (real or complex) dimension k(n − k).

== Scheme ==
In the realm of algebraic geometry, the Grassmannian can be constructed as a scheme by expressing it as a representable functor.

=== Representable functor ===
If $\mathcal E$ is a quasi-coherent sheaf on a scheme $S$ for a positive integer $k$, then to each $S$-scheme $T$, the Grassmannian functor associates the set of quotient modules of

$$\mathcal{E}_T := \mathcal E \otimes_{O_S} O_T$$

locally free of rank $k$ on $T$. We denote this set by $\mathbf{Gr}(k, \mathcal{E}_T)$.

This functor is representable by a separated $S$-scheme $\mathbf{Gr}(k, \mathcal{E})$. The latter is projective if $\mathcal {E}$ is finitely generated. When $S$ is the spectrum of a field $K$, then the sheaf $\mathcal{E}$ is given by a vector space $V$ and the usual Grassmannian variety of the dual space of $V$can be recovered, namely: $\mathbf{Gr}(k, V)$. By construction, the Grassmannian scheme is compatible with base changes: for any $S$-scheme $S'$, giving the canonical isomorphism

$$\mathbf{Gr}(k, \mathcal{E} ) \times_S S' \simeq \mathbf{Gr}(k, \mathcal{E}_{S'})$$

In particular, for any point $s$ of $S$, the canonical morphism $\{s\} = \text{Spec}K(s) \rightarrow S$ induces an isomorphism from the fiber $\mathbf{Gr}(k, \mathcal {E})_s$ to the usual Grassmannian $\mathbf{Gr}(k, \mathcal{E} \otimes_{O_S} K(s))$ over the residue field $K(s)$.

=== Universal family ===
Since the Grassmannian scheme represents a functor, it comes with a universal object, $\mathcal G$, which is an object of $\mathbf{Gr} \left (k, \mathcal{E}_{\mathbf {Gr}(k, \mathcal E)} \right),$ and therefore a quotient module $\mathcal G$ of $\mathcal E_{\mathbf {Gr}(k, \mathcal E)}$, locally free of rank $k$ over $\mathbf{Gr}(k, \mathcal{E})$. The quotient homomorphism induces a closed immersion from the projective bundle:

$$\mathbf{P}(\mathcal G) \to \mathbf{P} \left (\mathcal E_{\mathbf{Gr}(k, \mathcal E)} \right) = \mathbf P({\mathcal E}) \times_S \mathbf{Gr}(k, \mathcal E).$$

For any morphism of S-schemes:

$$T \to \mathbf{Gr}(k, \mathcal{E}),$$

this closed immersion induces a closed immersion

$$\mathbf{P}(\mathcal G_T) \to \mathbf{P} (\mathcal{E}) \times_S T.$$

Conversely, any such closed immersion comes from a surjective homomorphism of $O_T$-modules from $\mathcal E_T$ to a locally free module of rank $k$. Therefore, the elements of $\mathbf{Gr}(k, \mathcal E)(T)$ are exactly the projective subbundles of rank $k$ in $\mathbf{P} (\mathcal{E}) \times_S T.$

Under this identification, when $T=S$ is the spectrum of a field $K$ and $\mathcal E$ is given by a vector space $V$, the set of rational points $\mathbf{Gr}(k, \mathcal{E})(K)$ correspond to the projective linear subspaces of dimension $k-1$ in $\mathbf{P}(V)$, and the image of $\mathbf{P}(\mathcal G)(K)$ in

$$\mathbf{P}(V) \times_K \mathbf{Gr}(k, \mathcal E)$$

is the set

$$\left\{ (x, v) \in \mathbf{P}(V)(K) \times \mathbf{Gr}(k, \mathcal E)(K) \mid  x\in v \right\}.$$

== Plücker embedding ==
The Plücker embedding is a natural embedding of the Grassmannian $\mathbf{Gr}(k, V)$ into the projectivization of the $k$th exterior power $\Lambda^k V$ of $V$.

$$\iota : \mathbf{Gr}(k, V) \to \mathbf{P} \left(\Lambda^k V \right ).$$

Supposing that $w\subset V$ is a $k$-dimensional subspace of the $n$-dimensional vector space $V$. To define $\iota(w)$, a basis $(w_1, \cdots, w_k)$ for $w$ can be chosen with $\iota(w)$ as the projectivization of the wedge product of these basis elements:
$$\iota(w) = [w_1 \wedge \cdots \wedge w_k],$$
where $[ \, \cdot \, ]$ denotes the projective equivalence class.

A different basis for $w$ gives a different wedge product, but the two differ only by a non-zero scalar multiple (the determinant of the change of basis matrix). Since the right-hand side takes values in the projectivized space, $\iota$ is well-defined. That it is an embedding, is shown by recovering $w$ from $\iota(w)$ as the span of the set of all vectors $v\in V$ such that

$$v \wedge \iota (w) = 0$$.

=== Plücker coordinates and Plücker relations ===
The Plücker embedding of the Grassmannian satisfies simple quadratic relations called the Plücker relations. These show that the Grassmannian $\mathbf{Gr}_k(V)$ embeds as a nonsingular projective algebraic subvariety of the projectivization $\mathbf{P}(\Lambda^k V)$ of the $k$th exterior power of $V$ and gives another method for constructing the Grassmannian. To state the Plücker relations, a basis $(e_1, \cdots, e_n)$ for $V$ is fixed, and $w\subset V$ becomes a $k$-dimensional subspace of $V$ with basis $(w_1, \cdots, w_k)$. $(w_{i1}, \cdots, w_{in})$ becomes the components of $w_i$ with respect to the chosen basis of $V$, and $(W^1, \dots, W^n)$ the $k$-component column vectors forming the transpose of the corresponding homogeneous coordinate matrix:

$$W^T = [W^1\, \cdots W^n]= \begin{bmatrix} w_{11} &\cdots & w_{1n}\\ \vdots & \ddots & \vdots\\ w_{k1} & \cdots & w_{kn}
\end{bmatrix} ,$$

For any ordered sequence $1\le i_1 < \cdots < i_k \le n$ of $k$ positive integers, $w_{i_1, \dots , i_k}$ becomes the determinant of the $k \times k$ matrix with columns $[W^{i_1}, \dots , W^{i_k}]$. The elements $\{w_{i_1, \dots , i_k} \, \vert \, 1 \leq i_1 < \cdots < i_k \leq n\}$ are the Plücker coordinates of the element $w \in \mathbf{Gr}_k(V)$ of the Grassmannian (with respect to the basis $(e_1, \cdots, e_n)$ of $V$). These are the linear coordinates of the image $\iota(w)$ of $w$ under the Plücker map, relative to the basis of the exterior power $\Lambda^k V$ space generated by the basis $(e_1, \cdots, e_n)$ of $V$. Since a change of basis for $w$ gives rise to multiplication of the Plücker coordinates by a nonzero constant (the determinant of the change of basis matrix), these are only defined up to projective equivalence, and hence determine a point in $\mathbf{P}(\Lambda^k V)$.

For any two ordered sequences $1 \leq i_1 < i_2 \cdots < i_{k-1} \leq n$ and $1 \leq j_1 < j_2 \cdots < j_{k+1} \leq n$ of $k-1$ and $k+1$ positive integers, respectively, the following homogeneous quadratic equations, known as the Plücker relations, or the Plücker-Grassmann relations, are valid and determine the image $\iota(\mathbf{Gr}_k(V))$ of $\mathbf{Gr}_k(V)$ under the Plücker map embedding:

$$\sum_{l=1}^{k+1} (-1)^\ell w_{i_1, \dots , i_{k-1}, j_l} w_{j_1, \dots , \widehat{j_l}, \dots j_{k+1}} = 0,$$

where $j_1, \ldots , \widehat{j_l}, \ldots j_{k+1}$ denotes the sequence $j_1, \ldots, j_{k+1}$ with the term $j_l$ omitted. These are consistent, determining a nonsingular projective algebraic variety, but they are not algebraically independent. They are equivalent to the statement that $\iota(w)$ is the projectivization of a completely decomposable element of $\Lambda^k V$.

When $\dim(V) =4$, and $k=2$ (the simplest Grassmannian that is not a projective space), the above reduces to a single equation. Denoting the homogeneous coordinates of the image $\iota(\mathbf{Gr}_2(V) \subset \mathbf{P}(\Lambda^2 V)$ under the Plücker map as $(w_{12}, w_{13}, w_{14}, w_{23}, w_{24}, w_{34})$, this single Plücker relation is

$$w_{12}w_{34} - w_{13}w_{24} + w_{14}w_{23} = 0.$$

In general, many more equations are needed to define the image $\iota(\mathbf{Gr}_k(V))$ of the Grassmannian in $\mathbf{P}(\Lambda^k V)$ under the Plücker embedding.

== Duality ==
Every $k$-dimensional subspace $W \subset V$ determines an $(n-k)$-dimensional quotient space $V/W$ of $V$. This gives the natural short exact sequence:

$$0 \rightarrow W \rightarrow V \rightarrow V/W \rightarrow 0.$$

Taking the dual to each of these three spaces and the dual linear transformations yields an inclusion of $(V/W)^*$ in $V^*$ with quotient $W^*$

$$0 \rightarrow (V/W)^* \rightarrow V^* \rightarrow W^* \rightarrow 0.$$

Using the natural isomorphism of a finite-dimensional vector space with its double dual shows that taking the dual again recovers the original short exact sequence. Consequently, a one-to-one correspondence links $k$-dimensional subspaces of $V$ and $(n-k)$-dimensional subspaces of $V^*$. In terms of the Grassmannian, this gives a canonical isomorphism

$$\mathbf{Gr}_k(V) \leftrightarrow \mathbf{Gr}_{n-k}(V^*)$$

that associates to each subspace $W \subset V$ its annihilator $W^0\subset V^*$. Choosing an isomorphism of $V$ with $V^*$ therefore determines a (non-canonical) isomorphism between $\mathbf{Gr}_k( V)$ and $\mathbf{Gr}_{n-k}(V)$. An isomorphism of $V$ with $V^*$ is equivalent to the choice of an inner product, so with respect to the chosen inner product, this isomorphism of Grassmannians sends any $k$-dimensional subspace into its $(n-k)$-dimensional orthogonal complement.

== Schubert cells ==
The detailed study of Grassmannians makes use of a decomposition into affine subpaces called Schubert cells, which were first applied in enumerative geometry. The Schubert cells for $\mathbf{Gr}_k(V)$ are defined in terms of a specified complete flag of subspaces $V_1 \subset V_2 \subset \cdots \subset V_n=V$ of dimension $\mathrm{dim}(V_i) = i$. For any integer partition

$$\lambda =(\lambda_1, \cdots, \lambda_k)$$

of weight

$$|\lambda|=\sum_{i=1}^k\lambda_i$$

consisting of weakly decreasing non-negative integers

$$\lambda_1 \geq \cdots \geq \lambda_k \geq 0,$$

whose Young diagram fits within the rectangular one $(n-k)^k$, the Schubert cell $X_\lambda(k,n)\subset \mathbf{Gr}_k(V)$ consists of those elements $W \in \mathbf{Gr}_k(V)$ whose intersections with the subspaces $\{V_i\}$ have the following dimensions

$$X_\lambda(k,n) = \{W \in \mathbf{Gr}_k(V)\, | \, \dim(W \cap V_{n-k+j-\lambda_j}) = j\}.$$

These are affine spaces, and their closures (within the Zariski topology) are Schubert varieties.

As an example of the technique, determining the Euler characteristic $\chi_{k,n}$ of the Grassmannian $\mathbf{Gr}_k(\mathbf{R}^n)$ of k-dimensional subspaces of R^{n} is illustrative. Fixing a $1$-dimensional subspace $\mathbf{R}\subset \mathbf{R}^n$ and partitioning $\mathbf{Gr}_k(\mathbf{R}^n)$ into k-dimensional subspaces of R^{n} that contain R and those that do not, reveals that the former is $\mathbf{Gr}_{k-1}(\mathbf{R}^{n-1})$ and the latter is a rank $k$ vector bundle over $\mathbf{Gr}_k(\mathbf{R}^{n-1})$. This gives recursive formulae:

$$\chi_{k,n} = \chi_{k-1,n-1} + (-1)^k \chi_{k, n-1}, \qquad \chi_{0,n} = \chi_{n,n} = 1.$$

Solving these recursion relations gives the formula: $\chi_{k,n}=0$ if $n$ is even and $k$ is odd and

$$\chi_{k, n} = \begin{pmatrix}\left\lfloor \frac{n}{2} \right\rfloor \\ \left\lfloor \frac{k}{2} \right\rfloor
\end{pmatrix}$$

otherwise.

=== Cohomology ring ===
Every point in the complex Grassmann manifold $\mathbf{Gr}_k(\mathbf{C}^n)$ defines a $k$-plane in $n$-space. Mapping each point in a k-plane to the point representing that plane in the Grassmannian yields the vector bundle $E$, which generalizes the tautological bundle of a projective space. Similarly the $(n-k)$-dimensional orthogonal complements of these planes yield an orthogonal vector bundle $F$. The integral cohomology of the Grassmannians is generated, as a ring, by the Chern classes of $E$. In particular, all of the integral cohomology is at even degree as in the case of a projective space.

These generators are subject to a set of relations, which defines the ring. The defining relations are easy to express for a larger set of generators, which consists of the Chern classes of $E$ and $F$. Then the relations state that the direct sum of the bundles $E$ and $F$ is trivial. Functoriality of the total Chern classes shows that this relation is

$$c(E) c(F) = 1.$$

The quantum cohomology ring was calculated by Edward Witten. The generators are identical to those of the classical cohomology ring, but with the top relation

$$c_k(E) c_{n-k}(F) = (-1)^{n-k}$$

reflecting the existence in the corresponding quantum field theory of an instanton with $2n$ fermionic zero-modes, which violates the degree of the cohomology corresponding to a state by $2n$ units.

== Associated measure ==
When $V$ is an $n$-dimensional Euclidean space, a uniform measure on $\mathbf{Gr}_k(V)$ can be defined. If $\theta_n$ is the unit Haar measure on the orthogonal group $O(n)$ and fix $w\in \mathbf{Gr}_k(V)$, then for a set $A \subset\mathbf{Gr}_k(V)$ ,

$$\gamma_{k, n}(A) = \theta_n\{g \in \operatorname{O}(n) : gw \in A\}.$$

This measure is invariant under the action of the group $O(n)$; that is,

$$\gamma_{k,n}(gA)= \gamma_{k,n}(A)$$

for all $g \in O(n)$. Since $\theta_n(O(n))=1$, $\gamma_{k,n}(\mathbf{Gr}_k(V))= 1$. Moreover, $\gamma_{k,n}$ is a Radon measure with respect to the metric space topology and is uniform in the sense that every ball of the same radius (with respect to this metric) is of the same measure.

== Oriented Grassmannian ==
This is the manifold consisting of all oriented $k$-dimensional subspaces of $\mathbf{R}^n$. It is a double cover of $\mathbf{Gr}_k(\mathbf{R}^n)$ and is denoted by $\widetilde{\mathbf{Gr}}_k(\mathbf{R}^n)$.

As a homogeneous space it can be expressed as:

$$\widetilde{\mathbf{Gr}}_k(\mathbf{R}^n)=\operatorname{SO}(n) / (\operatorname{SO}(k) \times \operatorname{SO}(n-k)).$$

== Orthogonal isotropic Grassmannians ==
Given a real or complex nondegenerate symmetric bilinear form $Q$ on the $n$-dimensional space $V$ (i.e., a scalar product), the totally isotropic Grassmannian $\mathbf{Gr}^0_k(V, Q)$ is defined as the subvariety $\mathbf{Gr}^0_k(V, Q) \subset \mathbf{Gr}_k(V)$ consisting of all $k$-dimensional subspaces $w\subset V$ for which

$$Q(u, v)=0, \, \forall \, u, v \in w,$$

i.e., totally isotropic subspaces. Maximal isotropic Grassmannians with respect to a real or complex scalar product are related to Cartan's theory of spinors. Under the Cartan embedding, their connected components are equivariantly diffeomorphic to the projectivized minimal spinor orbit. Under the spin representation, the projective pure spinor variety which, similarly to the image of the Plücker map embedding, is cut out as the intersection of a number of quadrics, becomes Cartan quadrics.

== Applications ==
=== Pure mathematics ===
A key application of Grassmannians is as the "universal" embedding space for bundles with connections on compact manifolds.

Another important application is Schubert calculus, which is the enumerative geometry involved in calculating the number of points, lines, planes, etc. in a projective space that intersect a given set of points, lines, etc., using the intersection theory of Schubert varieties. Subvarieties of Schubert cells can also be used to parametrize simultaneous eigenvectors of complete sets of commuting operators in quantum integrable spin systems, such as the Gaudin model, using the Bethe ansatz method.

=== Physics ===
A further application is to the solution of hierarchies of classical completely integrable systems of partial differential equations, such as the Kadomtsev–Petviashvili equation and the associated KP hierarchy. These can be expressed in terms of Abelian group flows on an infinite-dimensional Grassmann manifold. The KP equations, expressed in Hirota bilinear form in terms of the KP Tau function are equivalent to the Plücker relations. A similar construction holds for solutions of the BKP integrable hierarchy, in terms of Abelian group flows on an infinite dimensional, maximal isotropic, Grassmann manifold.

Finite dimensional positive Grassmann manifolds can be used to express soliton solutions of KP equations that are nonsingular for real values of the KP flow parameters.

The scattering amplitudes of subatomic particles in maximally supersymmetric super Yang-Mills theory may be calculated in the planar limit via a positive Grassmannian construct called the amplituhedron.

In quantum chemistry and many-body quantum physics, the Grassmannian can be identified with the space of pure many-particle fermionic states which can be written as a single Slater determinant. The geometric properties of the Grassmannian can be used to study theoretical properties of the Hartree-Fock method.

=== Computer science ===
Grassmann manifolds have found applications in computer vision tasks of video-based face recognition and shape recognition, and are used in the data-visualization technique known as the grand tour.

Grassmann flows are under consideration as a potential replacement for attention mechanisms in large language models, based on research showing competitive performance with better computational efficiency and interpretability. Using low-dimensional subspaces on the Grassmann manifold, causal Grassmann layers allow:

- reducing token states to a lower dimension (e.g., from 256 to 32).
- encoding local token pairs as 2D subspaces using Plücker coordinates.
- fusing into hidden states through gated mixing, allowing information to "flow" via controlled deformations over multi-scale local windows.
- avoiding high-dimensional, pairwise tensor operations of standard self-attention, confining computations to a structured manifold for more traceable geometry.

In contrast to attention models, which process context at the scale of (O(n²)), Grassmann flows address scale linearly (O(n) for fixed subspace rank), enabling efficiency on long sequences without approximations like sparse attention.

== See also ==
- For an example of the use of Grassmannians in differential geometry, see Gauss map
- Flag manifolds are generalizations of Grassmannians whose elements, viewed geometrically, are nested sequences of subspaces of specified dimensions.
- Stiefel manifolds are bundles of orthonormal frames over Grassmannians.
- Given a distinguished class of subspaces, one can define Grassmannians of these subspaces, such as Isotropic Grassmannians or Lagrangian Grassmannians.
- Grassmannians provide classifying spaces in K-theory, notably the classifying space for U(n). In the homotopy theory of schemes, the Grassmannian plays a similar role for algebraic K-theory.
- Affine Grassmannian
- Grassmann bundle
- Grassmann graph
- Chow variety
