= Quadric (disambiguation) =

Quadric is the locus of the zeros of a polynomial of degree two. It may also refer to:

- Quadrics (company), a computing company
- Quadric (algebraic geometry), a concept in algebraic geometry
