= Bracket algebra =

In mathematics, a bracket algebra is an algebraic system that connects the notion of a supersymmetry algebra with a symbolic representation of projective invariants.

Given that L is a proper signed alphabet and Super[L] is the supersymmetric algebra, the bracket algebra Bracket[L] of dimension n over the field K is the quotient of the algebra Brace{L} obtained by imposing the congruence relations below, where w, w', ..., w" are any monomials in Super[L]:

1. {w} = 0 if length(w) ≠ n
2. {w}{w'}...{w"} = 0 whenever any positive letter a of L occurs more than n times in the monomial {w}{w'}...{w"}.
3. Let {w}{w'}...{w"} be a monomial in Brace{L} in which some positive letter a occurs more than n times, and let b, c, d, e, ..., f, g be any letters in L.

== See also ==
- Bracket ring
