= Plucking =

Pluck or plucking may refer to:

== Removal ==
- Plucking (hair removal), the removal of hair, fur, or feathers
- Feather-plucking, a behavior in birds
- Plucking post, as used by birds of prey to dismember their prey
- Plucking (glaciation), a process related to glaciers

== Music ==
- Plucking, the action of playing a plucked string instrument
  - Pizzicato, a method of playing string instruments
- "P.L.U.C.K." (song), by System of a Down

== Places ==
- Pluck, Texas, a community in the United States
- Pluck, County Donegal, community served by Pluck railway station

== Other uses ==
- Pluck or offal, the internal organs of livestock
- One of two U.S. Navy ships named USS Pluck
- Pluck (company), an Internet company acquired by Demand Media
- PLUCK, an RMITV television series
- Pluck (magazine), British story paper running from 1894 to 1916 under Amalgamated Press
- Lee Pluck (born 1982), footballer

== See also ==
- Plucky (disambiguation)
