= Quartic surface =

Surface described by a 4th-degree polynomial

In mathematics, especially in algebraic geometry, a quartic surface is a surface defined by an equation of degree 4.

More specifically there are two closely related types of quartic surface: affine and projective. An affine quartic surface is the solution set of an equation of the form

$$f(x,y,z)=0\$$

where f is a polynomial of degree 4, such as $f(x,y,z) = x^4 + y^4 + xyz + z^2 - 1$. This is a surface in affine space A^{3}.

On the other hand, a projective quartic surface is a surface in projective space P^{3} of the same form, but now f is a homogeneous polynomial of 4 variables of degree 4, so for example $f(x,y,z,w) = x^4 + y^4 + xyzw + z^2 w^2 - w^4$.

If the base field is $\mathbb{R}$ or $\mathbb{C}$ the surface is said to be real or complex respectively. One must be careful to distinguish between algebraic Riemann surfaces, which are in fact quartic curves over $\mathbb{C}$, and quartic surfaces over $\mathbb{R}$. For instance, the Klein quartic is a real surface given as a quartic curve over $\mathbb{C}$. If on the other hand the base field is finite, then it is said to be an arithmetic quartic surface.

== Special quartic surfaces ==
- Dupin cyclides
- The Fermat quartic, given by x^{4} + y^{4} + z^{4} + w^{4} =0 (an example of a K3 surface).
- More generally, certain K3 surfaces are examples of quartic surfaces.
- Kummer surface
- Plücker surface
- Weddle surface

== See also ==
- Quadric surface (The union of two quadric surfaces is a special case of a quartic surface)
- Cubic surface (The union of a cubic surface and a plane is another particular type of quartic surface)
