= Pluck, Texas =

Pluck
- Unincorporated area
- Nickname: Stryker
- Location within the state of Texas Pluck (the United States)
- Coordinates: 31°0′41″N 94°44′37″W
- Country: United States
- State: Texas
- County: Polk
- Time zone: UTC-6 (Central (CST))
  - Summer (DST): UTC-5 (CDT)
- GNIS feature ID: 1380382

Pluck is an unincorporated community in Polk County, Texas, United States.

== History ==
A variant name was "Stryker." A post office called Stryker was established in 1885, and closed in 1913, and a post office called Pluck was in operation from 1918 until 1951. The origin of the name "Pluck" is obscure.
