= Julius Plücker =

German mathematician and physicist (1801–1868)

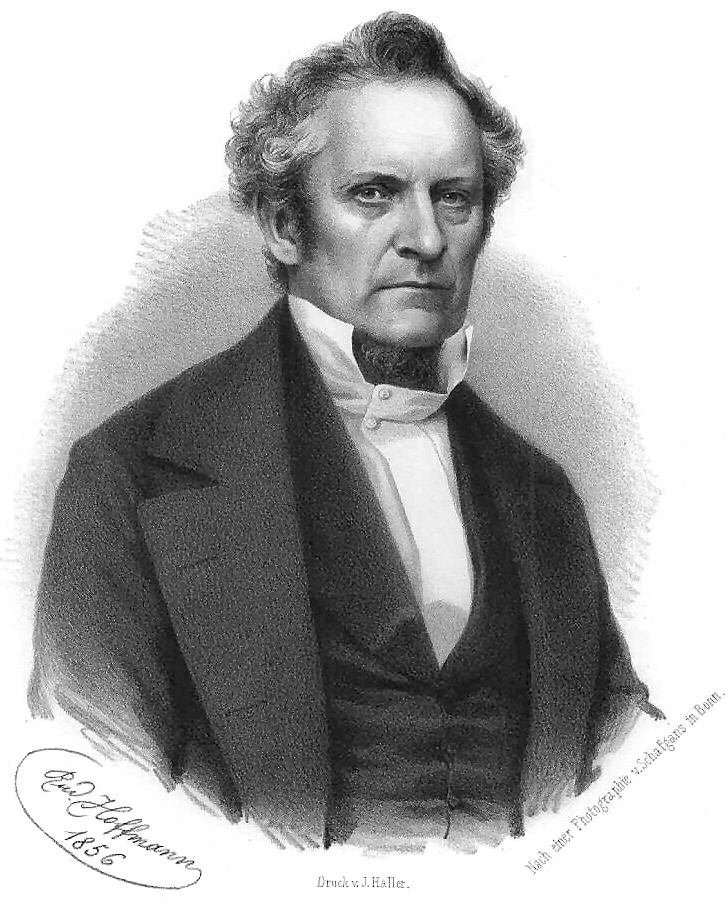
- Julius Plücker
- Born: 16 July 1801; Elberfeld, Duchy of Berg, Holy Roman Empire
- Died: 22 May 1868 (aged 66); Bonn, Kingdom of Prussia
- Education: University of Bonn; University of Heidelberg; University of Berlin; University of Paris; University of Marburg
- Known for: Plücker's conoid; Plücker coordinates; Plücker embedding; Plücker formula; Plücker matrix; Plücker relations; Plücker surface; Homogeneous coordinates
- Awards: Copley Medal (1866)
- Scientific career
- Fields: Mathematics; Physics
- Workplaces: University of Bonn; University of Berlin; University of Halle
- Doctoral advisor: Christian Ludwig Gerling
- Doctoral students: Felix Klein; August Beer; Johann Hittorf; Friedrich Lange

Julius Plücker (16 July 1801 – 22 May 1868) was a German mathematician and physicist. He made fundamental contributions to the field of analytical geometry and was a pioneer in the investigations of cathode rays that led eventually to the discovery of the electron. He also vastly extended the study of Lamé curves.

== Biography ==
=== Early years ===
Plücker was born at Elberfeld (now part of Wuppertal) on July 16th, 1801. After being educated at Düsseldorf and at the universities of Bonn, Heidelberg and Berlin he went to Paris in 1823, where he came under the influence of the great school of French geometers, whose founder, Gaspard Monge, had only recently died.

In 1825 he returned to Bonn, and in 1828 was made professor of mathematics.

In the same year he published the first volume of his Analytisch-geometrische Entwicklungen, which introduced the method of "abridged notation".

In 1831 he published the second volume, in which he clearly established on a firm and independent basis projective duality.

=== Career ===
In 1836, Plücker was made professor of physics at University of Bonn. In 1858, after a year of working with vacuum tubes of his Bonn colleague Heinrich Geißler, he published his first classical researches on the action of the magnet on the electric discharge in rarefied gases. He found that the discharge caused a fluorescent glow to form on the glass walls of the vacuum tube, and that the glow could be made to shift by applying an electromagnet to the tube, thus creating a magnetic field. It was later shown that the glow was produced by cathode rays.

Plücker, first by himself and afterwards in conjunction with Johann Hittorf, made many important discoveries in the spectroscopy of gases. He was the first to use the vacuum tube with the capillary part now called a Geissler tube, by means of which the luminous intensity of feeble electric discharges was raised sufficiently to allow of spectroscopic investigation. He anticipated Robert Wilhelm Bunsen and Gustav Kirchhoff in announcing that the lines of the spectrum were characteristic of the chemical substance which emitted them, and in indicating the value of this discovery in chemical analysis. According to Hittorf, he was the first who saw the three lines of the hydrogen spectrum, which a few months after his death, were recognized in the spectrum of the solar protuberances.

In 1865, Plücker returned to the field of geometry and invented what was known as line geometry in the nineteenth century. In projective geometry, Plücker coordinates refer to a set of homogeneous co-ordinates introduced initially to embed the space of lines in projective space $\mathbf{P}^3$ as the Klein quadric in $\mathbf{P}^5$. The construction uses 2×2 minor determinants, or equivalently the second exterior power of the underlying vector space of dimension 4. It is now part of the theory of Grassmannians $\mathbf{Gr}(k, V)$ ($k$-dimensional subspaces of an $n$-dimensional vector space $V$), to which the generalization of these co-ordinates to $k \times k$ minors of the $n \times k$ matrix of homogeneous coordinates, also known as Plücker coordinates, apply. The embedding of the Grassmannian $\mathbf{Gr}(k, V)$ into the projectivization $\mathbf{P}(\Lambda^k(V))$ of the $k$th exterior power of $V$ is known as the Plücker embedding.

== Bibliography ==
- 1828: Analytisch-Geometrische Entwicklungen from Internet Archive
- 1835: System der analytischen Geometrie, auf neue Betrachtungsweisen gegründet, und insbesondere eine ausführliche Theorie der Kurven dritter Ordnung enthaltend
- 1839: Theorie der algebraischen Curven, gegründet auf eine neue Behandlungsweise der analytischen Geometrie
- 1846: System der Geometrie des Raumes in neuer analytischer Behandlungsweise, insbesondere die Theorie der Flächen zweiter Ordnung und Classe enthaltend
- 1852: System der Geometrie des Raumes in neuer analytischer Behandlungsweise, insbesondere die Theorie der Flächen zweiter Ordnung und Classe enthaltend. Zweite wohlfeilere Auflage
- 1865: On a New Geometry of Space Philosophical Transactions of the Royal Society 14: 53–8
- 1868: Neue Geometrie des Raumes gegründet auf die Betrachtung der geraden Linie als Raumelement. Erste Abtheilung. Leipzig.
- 1869: Neue Geometrie des Raumes gegründet auf die Betrachtung der geraden Linie als Raumelement. Zweite Abtheilung. Ed. F. Klein. Leipzig.
- 1895–1896: Gesammelte Wissenschaftliche Abhandlungen, Band 1 (vol. 1), Mathematische Abhandlungen (edited by Arthur Moritz Schoenflies & Friedrich Pockels), Teubner 1895, Archive, Band 2 (vol. 2), Physikalische Abhandlungen (edited by Friedrich Pockels), 1896, Archive

== Awards ==
Plücker was the recipient of the Copley Medal from the Royal Society in 1866.

== See also ==
- Birkeland–Eyde process
- Duality (projective geometry)
- Grassmannian
- Ion pump
- Parameter space
- Physical crystallography before X-rays
- Timeline of low-temperature technology

== Bibliography ==
- Born, Heinrich, Die Stadt Elberfeld. Festschrift zur Dreihundert-Feier 1910. J.H. Born, Elberfeld 1910
- Giermann, Heiko, Stammfolge der Familie Plücker, in: Deutsches Geschlechterbuch, 217. Bd, A. Starke Verlag, Limburg a.d.L. 2004
- Strutz, Edmund, Die Ahnentafeln der Elberfelder Bürgermeister und Stadtrichter 1708–1808. 2. Auflage, Verlag Degener & Co., Neustadt an der Aisch 1963 ISBN 3-7686-4069-8
- Gustav Karsten (1888). "Plücker, Julius" . Allgemeine Deutsche Biographie (in German). Vol. 26. Leipzig: Duncker & Humblot. pp. 321–323.
