= Klein quadric =

Polynomial characterizing lines in projective 3-space

In algebraic geometry, the Klein quadric is a 4-dimensional projective variety (a quadric).

== Setup ==
Consider the 3-dimensional projective space $\mathbb P^3$. There is a 4-dimensional family of lines in it. The Plücker coordinates map each line in $\mathbb P^3$ to a point in $\mathbb P^5$:
$$[a_1, \dots, a_4], [b_1, \dots, b_4] \mapsto [p_{ij}]_{1 \leq i < j \leq 4}, \quad p_{ij} := a_ib_j - a_jb_i$$
The resulting 4-dimensional surface in $\mathbb P^5$ is the Klein quadric, with equation
$$p_{12} p_{34} - p_{13}p_{24} + p_{14}p_{23} = 0$$

== Basic properties ==
Many properties of line configurations in $\mathbb P^3$ correspond to properties of the Klein quadric.

Consider two lines in $\mathbb P^3$ that intersect each other at a point. Write their intersection as $[a_1, \dots, a_4]$, and write their equations as $[a_1, \dots, a_4], [b_1, \dots, b_4]$ and $[a_1, \dots, a_4], [c_1, \dots, c_4]$. Now, consider the pencil of lines spanned by them. They form a plane in $\mathbb P^3$. They are parameterized as $[a_1, \dots, a_4], [t b_1 + s c_1, \dots, t b_4 + s c_4]$ with $[t, s] \in \mathbb P^1$. Since the Plücker coordinates are bilinear, this pencil maps to $p_{ij} := t(a_ib_j - a_jb_i) + s(a_ic_j - a_jc_i)$, a line in the Klein quadric. By this and similar arguments, we obtain:

- Given two intersecting lines in $\mathbb P^3$, they span a 1-dimensional family of lines, corresponding to a line passing two points in the Klein quadric.
- Given a point in $\mathbb P^3$, it has a 2-dimensional family of lines incident to it, corresponding to another plane in the Klein quadric. This is equivalent to considering the pencil spanned by three intersecting lines in $\mathbb P^3$.
- Given a plane in $\mathbb P^3$, it has a 2-dimensional family of lines incident to it, corresponding to a plane in the Klein quadric.
- Given a line $p$ in $\mathbb P^3$, it has a 3-dimensional family of lines incident to it, corresponding to a 3-dimensional cone in $\mathbb P^4$, which is the intersection of $p$'s tangent hyperplane with the Klein quadric itself. This cone is doubly ruled by 2-dimensional planes.
  - In one ruling, each point $x \in p$ corresponds to a family of lines incident to it, thus a plane in the Klein quadric.
  - In the other ruling, each plane $L \ni p$ corresponds to a family of lines incident to it, thus a plane in the Klein quadric.
  - Projectivizing the cone down to $\mathbb P^3$ results in the one-sheeted hyperboloid, producing the standard double ruling on it.

The Klein quadric allows certain problems to be solved visually:

- Given 4 lines in $\mathbb P^3$ in general position, there exists 2 lines intersecting them all. Equivalently, given 4 points $ABCD$ in the Klein quadric in general position, there exists 2 points $P, P'$ such that the lines $AP, \dots, DP$ fall inside the Klein quadric.

This is a sum of 3 quadratic terms of shape $pq$, which, when rotated by 45 degrees, yields $x^2 - y^2$. Thus, by rotating each pair by 45 degrees, we obtain $\sum_{i=1}^3 x_i^2 = \sum_{i=1}^3y_i^2$. This is precisely the projectivized null cone of $\R^{3+3}$.

As described on another page, the null cone has a $O(3)$ family of 3-flats, with formula $Ax = y$ for $A \in O(3)$. Projectivized, the Klein quadric has a $O(3)$ family of 2-flats $\mathbb P^2$, which splits into a family of rotations $SO(3)$, and the other family of mirror reflections $O(3)^-$.

- Given $A \in SO(3)$, the 2-flat $Ax = y$ in the Klein quadric corresponds to a family of lines incident to a point in $\mathbb P^3$.
- Given $A \in O(3)^-$, the 2-flat $Ax = y$ in the Klein quadric corresponds to a family of lines incident to a plane in $\mathbb P^3$.

Its subvarieties are line complexes.

== Equivalence ==
The Klein quadric actually contains all the information needed to completely reconstruct the projective geometry of $\mathbb P^3$.

- We declare the points of the Klein quadric to be "K-lines".
- As previously described, the Klein quadric has many 2-flats. These split into two families. In family 1, any two 2-flats intersect at a point. In family 2, any two 2-flats intersect at a point. Between families 1 and 2, any two 2-flats are either skew (no intersection) or intersect at a line.
- We arbitrarily declare the members of one family to be "K-points", and the members of the other family to be "K-planes".
- We define incidence:
  - a K-point is incident to a K-line iff the 2-flat contains the point;
  - a K-plane is incident to a K-line iff the 2-flat contains the point;
  - a K-point is incident to a K-plane iff their 2-flats meet in a line.
- This gives us the complete incidence relation of $\mathbb P^3$, and thus specifies the projective geometry completely (by the Veblen–Young theorem).

This equivalence between $\mathbb P^3$ and the Klein quadric can be explained by the isomorphism of the Dynkin diagrams A_{3} and D_{3}.
