= Plücker embedding =

Embedding of a Grassmannian into projective space

In mathematics, the Plücker map embeds the Grassmannian $\mathrm{Gr}(k,V)$, whose elements are k-dimensional subspaces of an n-dimensional vector space V, either real or complex, in a projective space, thereby realizing it as a projective algebraic variety. More precisely, the Plücker map embeds $\mathrm{Gr}(k,V)$ into the projectivization $\mathbb{P}({\textstyle\bigwedge}^k V)$ of the $k$-th exterior power of $V$. The image is algebraic, consisting of the intersection of a number of quadrics defined by the § Plücker relations (see below).

The Plücker embedding was first defined by Julius Plücker in the case $k=2, n=4$ as a way of describing the lines in three-dimensional space (which, as projective lines in real projective space, correspond to two-dimensional subspaces of a four-dimensional vector space). The image of that embedding is the Klein quadric in RP^{5}.

Hermann Grassmann generalized Plücker's embedding to arbitrary k and n. The homogeneous coordinates of the image of the Grassmannian $\mathrm{Gr}(k,V)$ under the Plücker embedding, relative to the basis in the exterior space ${\textstyle\bigwedge}^k V$ corresponding to the natural basis in $V = K^n$ (where $K$ is the base field) are called Plücker coordinates.

== Definition ==
Denoting by $V= K^n$ the $n$-dimensional vector space over the field $K$, and by $\mathrm{Gr}(k, V)$ the Grassmannian of $k$-dimensional subspaces of $V$, the Plücker embedding is the map ι defined by

$$\begin{array}{cccc}
\iota : \  & \mathrm{Gr}(k, V) & \longrightarrow & \mathbb{P}({\textstyle\bigwedge}^k V),\\
&  {W}:=\operatorname{Span}( w_1, \ldots, w_k ) & \longmapsto & [ w_1 \wedge \cdots \wedge w_k ],
\end{array}$$

where $(w_1, \dots , w_k)$ is a basis for the element ${W}\in \mathrm{Gr}(k, V)$ and $[ w_1 \wedge \cdots \wedge w_k ]$ is the projective equivalence class of the element $w_1 \wedge \cdots \wedge w_k \in {\textstyle\bigwedge}^k V$ of the $k$th exterior power of $V$.

This is an embedding of the Grassmannian into the projectivization $\mathbb{P}({\textstyle\bigwedge}^k V)$. The image can be completely characterized as the intersection of a number of quadrics, the Plücker quadrics (see below), which are expressed by homogeneous quadratic relations on the Plücker coordinates (see below) that derive from linear algebra.

The bracket ring appears as the ring of polynomial functions on ${\textstyle\bigwedge}^k V$.

== Plücker relations ==
The image under the Plücker embedding satisfies a simple set of homogeneous quadratic relations, usually called the Plücker relations, or Grassmann–Plücker relations, defining the intersection of a number of quadrics in $\mathbb{P}({\textstyle\bigwedge}^k V)$. This shows that the Grassmannian embeds as an algebraic subvariety of $\mathbb{P}({\textstyle\bigwedge}^k V)$ and gives another method of constructing the Grassmannian. To state the Grassmann–Plücker relations, let ${W}\in \mathrm{Gr}(k, V)$ be the $k$-dimensional subspace spanned by the basis represented by column vectors $w_1, \dots, w_k$. Let $[W]$ be the $n \times k$ matrix whose columns are $w_1, \dots, w_k$; the matrix of $W$ with respect to a different basis is then $[W]A$ for any invertible $k \times k$ matrix $A$. For any ordered sequence $1\le i_1 < \cdots < i_k \le n$ of $k$ integers, let $\Delta_{i_1, \dots , i_k}$ be the determinant of the $k \times k$ submatrix of $[W]$ on the rows $(i_1, \dots i_k)$; this determinant is called a minor. Then $\{ \Delta_{i_1, \dots , i_k}\}$ are the Plücker coordinates of the element ${W}\in \mathrm{Gr}(k, V)$, the linear coordinates of the image $\iota({W})\in \mathbb{P}({\textstyle\bigwedge}^k V)$ relative to the standard basis $\{e_{i_1}\wedge\cdots\wedge e_{i_k}\}$ of ${\textstyle\bigwedge}^k V$. Changing the basis of $W$ just changes the Plücker coordinates by a nonzero factor $\det(A)$, the determinant of the change of basis matrix, giving the same point in $\mathbb{P}({\textstyle\bigwedge}^k V)$.

For any two ordered sequences:

$$i_1 < i_2 < \cdots < i_{k-1}, \quad j_1 < j_2 < \cdots < j_{k+1}$$

of positive integers $1 \le i_l, j_m \le n$, the following homogeneous equations are valid, and determine the image of $W$ under the Plücker map:

$\sum_{l=1}^{k+1} (-1)^l \Delta_{i_1, \dots , i_{k-1}, j_l} \Delta_{j_1, \dots , \hat{j}_l, \dots j_{k+1}}=0,$

where $j_1, \dots , \hat{j}_l, \dots j_{k+1}$ denotes that the term $j_l$ is omitted. These are the Plücker relations.

When dim(V) = 4 and k = 2, we get $\mathrm{Gr}(2, V)$, the simplest Grassmannian which is not a projective space, and the above reduces to a single equation. Denoting the coordinates of ${\textstyle\bigwedge}^2 V$ by

$$\Delta_{ij} = -\Delta_{ji}, \quad 1\le i,j \le 4,$$

the image of $\mathrm{Gr}(2, V)$ under the Plücker map is defined by the single equation

$$\Delta_{12}\Delta_{34} - \Delta_{13}\Delta_{24} + \Delta_{14}\Delta_{23}=0.$$

In general, many more equations are needed to define the image of the Plücker embedding, as in (1), but these are not, in general, algebraically independent. The maximal number of algebraically independent relations (on Zariski open sets) is given by the difference of dimension between $\mathbb{P}({\textstyle\bigwedge}^k V)$ and $\mathrm{Gr}(k, V)$, which is $\tbinom{n}{k} - k(n-k) -1.$
