= Moufang =

Moufang is the family name of the following people:

- Christoph Moufang (1817–1890), a Roman Catholic cleric
- Ruth Moufang (1905–1977), a German mathematician, after whom several concepts in mathematics are named:
  - Moufang–Lie algebra
  - Moufang loop
  - Moufang polygon
  - Moufang plane
  - Moufang set
- David Moufang (born 1966), German ambient techno musician
