= J-structure =

Algebraic structure

In mathematics, a J-structure is an algebraic structure over a field related to a Jordan algebra. The concept was introduced by Springer (1973) to develop a theory of Jordan algebras using linear algebraic groups and axioms taking the Jordan inversion as basic operation and Hua's identity as a basic relation. There is a classification of simple structures deriving from the classification of semisimple algebraic groups. Over fields of characteristic not equal to 2, the theory of J-structures is essentially the same as that of Jordan algebras.

== Definition ==
Let V be a finite-dimensional vector space over a field K and j a rational map from V to itself, expressible in the form n/N with n a polynomial map from V to itself and N a polynomial in K[V]. Let H be the subset of GL(V) × GL(V) containing the pairs (g,h) such that g∘j = j∘h: it is a closed subgroup of the product and the projection onto the first factor, the set of g which occur, is the structure group of j, denoted G'(j).

A J-structure is a triple (V,j,e) where V is a vector space over K, j is a birational map from V to itself and e is a non-zero element of V satisfying the following conditions.

- j is a homogeneous birational involution of degree −1
- j is regular at e and j(e) = e
- if j is regular at x, e + x and e + j(x) then

$$j(e+x) + j(e+j(x)) = e$$

- the orbit G e of e under the structure group G = G(j) is a Zariski open subset of V.

The norm associated to a J-structure (V,j,e) is the numerator N of j, normalised so that N(e) = 1. The degree of the J-structure is the degree of N as a homogeneous polynomial map.

The quadratic map of the structure is a map P from V to End(V) defined in terms of the differential dj at an invertible x. We put

$$P(x) = - (d j)_x^{-1} .$$

The quadratic map turns out to be a quadratic polynomial map on V.

The subgroup of the structure group G generated by the invertible quadratic maps is the inner structure group of the J-structure. It is a closed connected normal subgroup.

== J-structures from quadratic forms ==
Let K have characteristic not equal to 2. Let Q be a quadratic form on the vector space V over K with associated bilinear form Q(x,y) = Q(x+y) − Q(x) − Q(y) and distinguished element e such that Q(e,.) is not trivial. We define a reflection map x^{*} by

$$x^* = Q(x,e)e - x$$

and an inversion map j by

$$j(x) = Q(x)^{-1} x^* .$$

Then (V,j,e) is a J-structure.

=== Example ===
Let Q be the usual sum of squares quadratic function on K^{r} for fixed integer r, equipped with the standard basis e^{1},...,e^{r}. Then (K^{r}, Q, e^{r}) is a J-structure of degree 2. It is denoted O_{2}.

== Link with Jordan algebras ==
In characteristic not equal to 2, which we assume in this section, the theory of J-structures is essentially the same as that of Jordan algebras.

Let A be a finite-dimensional commutative non-associative algebra over K with identity e. Let L(x) denote multiplication on the left by x. There is a unique birational map i on A such that i(x).x = e if i is regular on x: it is homogeneous of degree −1 and an involution with i(e) = e. It may be defined by i(x) = L(x)^{−1}.e. We call i the inversion on A.

A Jordan algebra is defined by the identity

$$x(x^2 y) = x^2 (x y) .$$

An alternative characterisation is that for all invertible x we have

$$x^{-1}(x y) = x (x^{-1} y) .$$

If A is a Jordan algebra, then (A,i,e) is a J-structure. If (V,j,e) is a J-structure, then there exists a unique Jordan algebra structure on V with identity e with inversion j.

== Link with quadratic Jordan algebras ==
In general characteristic, which we assume in this section, J-structures are related to quadratic Jordan algebras. We take a quadratic Jordan algebra to be a finite dimensional vector space V with a quadratic map Q from V to End(V) and a distinguished element e. We let Q also denote the bilinear map Q(x,y) = Q(x+y) − Q(x) − Q(y). The properties of a quadratic Jordan algebra will be

- Q(e) = id_{V}, Q(x,e)y = Q(x,y)e
- Q(Q(x)y) = Q(x)Q(y)Q(x)
- Q(x)Q(y,z)x = Q(Q(x)y,x)z

We call Q(x)e the square of x. If the squaring is dominant (has Zariski dense image) then the algebra is termed separable.

There is a unique birational involution i such that Q(x)i x = x if Q is regular at x. As before, i is the inversion, definable by i(x) = Q(x)^{−1} x.

If (V,j,e) is a J-structure, with quadratic map Q then (V,Q,e) is a quadratic Jordan algebra. In the opposite direction, if (V,Q,e) is a separable quadratic Jordan algebra with inversion i, then (V,i,e) is a J-structure.

=== H-structure ===
McCrimmon proposed a notion of H-structure by dropping the density axiom and strengthening the third (a form of Hua's identity) to hold in all isotopes. The resulting structure is categorically equivalent to a quadratic Jordan algebra.

== Peirce decomposition ==
A J-structure has a Peirce decomposition into subspaces determined by idempotent elements. Let a be an idempotent of the J-structure (V,j,e), that is, a^{2} = a. Let Q be the quadratic map. Define

$$\phi_a(t,u) = Q(ta + u(e-a)) .$$

This is invertible for non-zero t,u in K and so φ defines a morphism from the algebraic torus GL_{1} × GL_{1} to the inner structure group G_{1}. There are subspaces

$$V_a = \left\lbrace{ x \in V : \phi_a(t,u) x = t^2 x }\right\rbrace$$
$$V'_a = \left\lbrace{ x \in V : \phi_a(t,u) x = tu x }\right\rbrace$$
$$V_{e-a} = \left\lbrace{ x \in V : \phi_a(t,u) x = u^2 x }\right\rbrace$$

and these form a direct sum decomposition of V. This is the Peirce decomposition for the idempotent a.

== Generalisations ==
If we drop the condition on the distinguished element e, we obtain "J-structures without identity". These are related to isotopes of Jordan algebras.
