= Moufang set =

In mathematics, a Moufang set is a particular kind of combinatorial system named after Ruth Moufang.

== Definition ==
A Moufang set is a pair $\left({ X; \{U_x\}_{x \in X} }\right)$ where X is a set and $\{U_x\}_{x \in X}$ is a family of subgroups of the symmetric group $\Sigma_X$ indexed by the elements of X. The system satisfies the conditions

- $U_y$ fixes y and is simply transitive on $X \setminus \{y\}$;
- Each $U_y$ normalises the family $\{U_x\}_{x \in X}$.

== Examples ==
Let K be a field and X the projective line P^{1}(K) over K. Let U_{x} be the stabiliser of each point x in the group PSL_{2}(K). The Moufang set determines K up to isomorphism or anti-isomorphism: an application of Hua's identity.

A quadratic Jordan division algebra gives rise to a Moufang set structure. If U is the quadratic map on the unital algebra J, let τ denote the permutation of the additive group (J,+) defined by

$$x \mapsto -x^{-1} = - U_x^{-1}(x) \ .$$

Then τ defines a Moufang set structure on J. The Hua maps h_{a} of the Moufang structure are just the quadratic U_{a} (De Medts & Weiss 2006). Note that the link is more natural in terms of J-structures.
