= Mutation (Jordan algebra) =

In mathematics, a mutation, also called a homotope, of a unital Jordan algebra is a new Jordan algebra defined by a given element of the Jordan algebra. The mutation has a unit if and only if the given element is invertible, in which case the mutation is called a proper mutation or an isotope. Mutations were first introduced by Max Koecher in his Jordan algebraic approach to Hermitian symmetric spaces and bounded symmetric domains of tube type. Their functorial properties allow an explicit construction of the corresponding Hermitian symmetric space of compact type as a compactification of a finite-dimensional complex semisimple Jordan algebra. The automorphism group of the compactification becomes a complex subgroup, the complexification of its maximal compact subgroup. Both groups act transitively on the compactification. The theory has been extended to cover all Hermitian symmetric spaces using the theory of Jordan pairs or Jordan triple systems. Koecher obtained the results in the more general case directly from the Jordan algebra case using the fact that only Jordan pairs associated with period two automorphisms of Jordan algebras are required.

== Definitions ==
Let A be a unital Jordan algebra over a field k of characteristic ≠ 2. For a in A define the Jordan multiplication operator on A by

$$\displaystyle{L(a)b=ab}$$

and the quadratic representation Q(a) by

$$Q(a)=2L(a)^2 -L(a^2). \,$$

It satisfies

$$Q(1)=I. \,$$

the fundamental identity

$$\displaystyle{Q(Q(a)b)=Q(a)Q(b)Q(a)}$$

the commutation or homotopy identity

$$\displaystyle{Q(a)R(b,a)=R(a,b)Q(a) = 2Q(Q(a)b,a),}$$

where

$$R(a,b)c=2Q(a,c)b,\,\,\, Q(x,y)=\frac{1}{2} (Q(x+y)-Q(x)-Q(y)).$$

In particular if a or b is invertible then

$$\displaystyle{R(a,b)=2Q(a)Q(a^{-1},b)=2Q(a,b^{-1})Q(b).}$$

It follows that A with the operations Q and R and the identity element defines a quadratic Jordan algebra, where a quadratic Jordan algebra consists of a vector space A with a distinguished element 1 and a quadratic map of A into endomorphisms of A, a ↦ Q(a), satisfying the conditions:

- Q(1) = id
- Q(Q(a)b) = Q(a)Q(b)Q(a) ("fundamental identity")
- Q(a)R(b,a) = R(a,b)Q(a) ("commutation or homotopy identity"), where R(a,b)c = (Q(a + c) − Q(a) − Q(c))b

The Jordan triple product is defined by

$$\{a,b,c\}=(ab)c+(cb)a -(ac)b, \,$$

so that

$$Q(a)b=\{a,b,a\},\,\,\, Q(a,c)b=\{a,b,c\},\,\,\, R(a,b)c=\{a,b,c\}. \,$$

There are also the formulas

$$Q(a,b)=L(a)L(b)+L(b)L(a) - L(ab),\,\,\, R(a,b)= [L(a),L(b)] + L(ab). \,$$

For y in A the mutation A^{y} is defined to the vector space A with multiplication

$$a\circ b= \{a,y,b\}. \,$$

If Q(y) is invertible, the mutual is called a proper mutation or isotope.

== Quadratic Jordan algebras ==
Let A be a quadratic Jordan algebra over a field k of characteristic ≠ 2. Following Jacobson (1969), a linear Jordan algebra structure can be associated with A such that, if L(a) is Jordan multiplication, then the quadratic structure is given by Q(a) = 2L(a)^{2} − L(a^{2}).

Firstly the axiom Q(a)R(b,a) = R(a,b)Q(a) can be strengthened to

$$\displaystyle{Q(a)R(b,a)=R(a,b)Q(a)=2Q(Q(a)b,a).}$$

Indeed, applied to c, the first two terms give

$$\displaystyle{2Q(a)Q(b,c)a=2Q(Q(a)c,a)b.}$$

Switching b and c then gives

$$\displaystyle{Q(a)R(b,a)c=2Q(Q(a)b,a)c.}$$

Now let

$$\displaystyle{L(a)=\frac{1}{2}R(a,1).}$$

Replacing b by a and a by 1 in the identity above gives

$$\displaystyle{R(a,1)=R(1,a)=2Q(a,1).}$$

In particular

$$\displaystyle{L(a)=Q(a,1),\,\,\,L(1)=Q(1,1)=I.}$$

The Jordan product is given by

$$\displaystyle{a\circ b = L(a)b=\frac{1}{2}R(a,1)b=Q(a,b)1,}$$

so that

$$\displaystyle{a\circ b = b \circ a.}$$

The formula above shows that 1 is an identity. Defining a^{2} by a∘a = Q(a)1, the only remaining condition to be verified is the Jordan identity

$$\displaystyle{[L(a),L(a^2)]=0.}$$

In the fundamental identity

$$\displaystyle{Q(Q(a)b)= Q(a)Q(b)Q(a),}$$

Replace a by a + t1, set b = 1 and compare the coefficients of t^{2} on both sides:

$$\displaystyle{Q(a)=2Q(a,1)^2 - Q(a^2,1)= 2L(a)^2 - L(a^2).}$$

Setting b = 1 in the second axiom gives

$$\displaystyle{Q(a)L(a)=L(a)Q(a),}$$

and therefore L(a) must commute with L(a^{2}).

== Inverses ==
Let A be a unital Jordan algebra over a field k of characteristic ≠ 2. An element a in a unital Jordan algebra A is said to be invertible if there is an element b such that ab = 1 and a^{2}b = a.

Properties.

- a is invertible if and only if there is an element b such that Q(a)b = a and Q(a)b^{2} =1. In this case ab = 1 and a^{2}b = a.

If ab = 1 and a^{2}b = a, then Q(a)b = 2a(ab) − (a^{2})b = a. The Jordan identity [L(x),L(x^{2})] = 0 can be polarized by replacing x by x + ty and taking the coefficient of t. This gives

$$\displaystyle{[L(x^2),L(y)]+2[L(xy),L(x)]=0.}$$

Taking x = a or b and y = b or a shows that L(a^{2}) commutes with L(b) and L(b^{2}) commutes with L(a). Hence (b^{2})(a^{2}) = 1. Applying L(b) gives b^{2}a = b. Hence Q(a)b^{2} = 1. Conversely if Q(a)b = a and Q(a)b^{2} = 1, then the second relation gives Q(a)Q(b)^{2} Q(a) = I. So both Q(a) and Q(b) are invertible. The first gives Q(a)Q(b)Q(a) = Q(a) so that Q(a) and Q(b) are each other's inverses. Since L(b) commutes with Q(b) it commutes with its inverse Q(a). Similarly L(a) commutes with Q(b). So (a^{2})b = L(b)a^{2} = Q(a)b = a and ab = L(b)Q(a)b= Q(a)Q(b)1= 1.

- a is invertible if and if only Q(a) defines a bijection on A. In that case a^{−1} = Q(a)^{−1}a. In this case Q(a)^{−1} = Q(a^{−1}).

Indeed, if a is invertible then the above implies Q(a) is invertible with inverse Q(b). Any inverse b satisfies Q(a)b = a, so b = Q(a)^{−1}a. Conversely if Q(a) is invertible let b = Q(a)^{−1}a. Then Q(a)b = a. The fundamental identity then implies that Q(b) and Q(a) are each other's inverses so that Q(a)b^{2} = Q(a)Q(b)1=1.

- If an inverse exists it is unique. If a is invertible, its inverse is denoted by a^{−1}.

This follows from the formula a^{−1} = Q(a)^{−1}a.

- a is invertible if and only if 1 lies in the image of Q(a).

Suppose that Q(a)c = 1. Then by the fundamental identity Q(a) is invertible, so a is invertible.

- Q(a)b is invertible if and only if a and b are invertible, in which case (Q(a)b)^{−1} = Q(a^{−1})b^{−1}.

This is an immediate consequence of the fundamental identity and the fact that STS is invertible if and only S and T are invertible.

- If a is invertible, then Q(a)L(a^{−1}) = L(a).

In the commutation identity Q(a)R(b,a) = Q(Q(a)b,a), set b = c^{2} with c = a^{−1}. Then Q(a)b = 1 and Q(1,a) = L(a). Since L(a) commutes with L(c^{2}), R(b,a) = L(c) = L(a^{−1}).

- a is invertible if and only if there is an element b such that ab = 1 and [L(a),L(b)] = 0 (a and b "commute"). In this case b = a^{−1}.

If L(a) and L(b) commute, then ba = 1 implies b(a^{2}) = a. Conversely suppose that a is invertible with inverse b. Then ab = 1. Moreover L(b) commutes with Q(b) and hence its inverse Q(a). So it commutes with L(a) = Q(a)L(b).

- When A is finite-dimensional over k, an element a is invertible if and only if it is invertible in k[a], in which case a^{−1} lies in k[a].

The algebra k[a] is commutative and associative, so if b is an inverse there ab =1 and a^{2}b = a. Conversely Q(a) leaves k[a] invariant. So if it is bijective on A it is bijective there. Thus a^{−1} = Q(a)^{−1}a lies in k[a].

== Elementary properties of proper mutations ==
- The mutation A^{y} is unital if and only if y is invertible in which case the unit is given by y^{−1}.
- The mutation A^{y} is a unital Jordan algebra if y is invertible
- The quadratic representation of A^{y} is given by Q_{y}(x) = Q(x)Q(y).

In fact multiplication in the algebra A^{y} is given by

$$\displaystyle{a\circ b = \{a,y,b\},}$$

so by definition is commutative. It follows that

$$\displaystyle{a\circ b = L_y(a)b,}$$

with

$$\displaystyle{L_y(a)=[L(a),L(y)] + L(ay).}$$

If e satisfies a ∘ e = a, then taking a = 1 gives

$$\displaystyle{ye=1.}$$

Taking a = e gives

$$\displaystyle{e(ya)=y(ea)}$$

so that L(y) and L(e) commute. Hence y is invertible and e = y^{−1}.

Now for y invertible set

$$\displaystyle{Q_y(a)=Q(a)Q(y),\,\,\, R_y(a,b)=R(a,Q(y)b).}$$

Then

$$\displaystyle{Q_y(e)=Q_y(y^{-1})= Q(y^{-1})Q(y)=I.}$$

Moreover,

$$\displaystyle{Q_y(a)Q_y(b)Q_y(a)=Q(a)Q(y)Q(b)Q(y)Q(a)Q(y)=Q(a) Q(Q(y)b) Q(a)Q(y) = Q(Q(a)Q(y)b)Q(y)=Q_y(Q_y(a)b).}$$

Finally

$$\displaystyle{Q(y)R(c,Q(y)d)Q(y)^{-1}=R(Q(y)c,d),}$$

since

$$\displaystyle{Q(y)R(c,Q(y)d)x=2Q(y)Q(c,x)Q(y)d=2Q(Q(y)c,Q(y)x)d=R(Q(y)c,d)Q(y)x.}$$

Hence

$$\displaystyle{Q_y(a)R_y(b,a)=Q(a)Q(y)R(b,Q(y)a)=Q(y^{-1}) Q(Q(y)a)R(b,Q(y)a)= Q(y)^{-1} R(Q(y)a,b)Q(Q(y)a)=R_y(a,b) Q_y(a).}$$

Thus (A,Q^{y},y^{−1}) is a unital quadratic Jordan algebra. It therefore corresponds to a linear Jordan algebra with the associated Jordan multiplication operator M(a) given by

$$\displaystyle{M(a)b=\frac{1}{2} R_y(a,e)b= \frac{1}{2} R(a,Q(y)e)b= \frac{1}{2}R(a,y)b=\{a,y,b\}=L_y(a)b.}$$

This shows that the operators L_{y}(a) satisfy the Jordan identity so that the proper mutation or isotope A^{y} is a unital Jordan algebra. The correspondence with quadratic Jordan algebras shows that its quadratic representation is given by Q_{y}.

== Nonunital mutations ==
The definition of mutation also applies to non-invertible elements y. If A is finite-dimensional over R or C, invertible elements a in A are dense, since invertibility is equivalent to the condition that det Q(a) ≠ 0. So by continuity the Jordan identity for proper mutations implies the Jordan identity for arbitrary mutations. In general the Jordan identity can be deduced from Macdonald's theorem for Jordan algebras because it involves only two elements of the Jordan algebra. Alternatively, the Jordan identity can be deduced by realizing the mutation inside a unital quadratic algebra.

For a in A define a quadratic structure on A_{1} = A ⊕ k by

$\displaystyle{Q_1(a\oplus \alpha 1)(b\oplus \beta 1)= \alpha^2\beta 1\oplus [\alpha^2 a + \alpha^2 b + 2\alpha\beta a + \alpha \{a,y, b\} + \beta Q(a)y + Q(a)Q(y)b].}$

It can then be verified that (A_{1}, Q_{1}, 1) is a unital quadratic Jordan algebra. The unital Jordan algebra to which it corresponds has A^{y} as an ideal, so that in particular A^{y} satisfies the Jordan identity. The identities for a unital quadratic Jordan algebra follow from the following compatibility properties of the quadratic map Q_{y}(a) = Q(a)Q(y) and the squaring map S_{y}(a) = Q(a)y:

- R_{y}(a,a) = L_{y}(S_{y}(a)).
- [Q_{y}(a),L_{y}(a)] = 0.
- Q_{y}(a)S_{y}(a) = S_{y}(S_{y}(a)).
- Q_{y}∘ S_{y} = S_{y} ∘ Q_{y}.
- Q_{y}(a) Q_{y}(b) S_{y}(a) = S_{y}(Q_{y}(a)b).
- Q_{y}(Q_{y}(a)b) = Q_{y}(a) Q_{y}(b) Q_{y}(a).

== Hua's identity ==
Let A be a unital Jordan algebra. If a, b and a – b are invertible, then Hua's identity holds:

$$\displaystyle{a^{-1} = (a-b)^{-1} + (a - Q(a)b^{-1})^{-1} = (a-b)^{-1} + Q(a)^{-1}(a^{-1} - b^{-1})^{-1}.}$$

In particular if x and 1 – x are invertible, then so too is 1 – x^{−1} with

$$\displaystyle{(1-x)^{-1} + (1-x^{-1})^{-1} = 1.}$$

To prove the identity for x, set y = (1 – x)^{−1}. Then L(y) = Q(1 – x)^{−1}L(1 – x). Thus L(y) commutes with L(x) and Q(x). Since Q(y) = Q(1 – x)^{−1}, it also commutes with L(x) and Q(x). Since L(x^{−1}) = Q(x)^{−1}L(x), L(y) also commutes with L(x^{−1}) and Q(x^{−1}).

It follows that (x^{−1} – 1)xy =(1 – x) y = 1. Moreover, y – 1 = xy since (1 – x)y = 1. So L(xy) commutes with L(x) and hence L(x^{−1} – 1). Thus 1 – x^{−1} has inverse 1 – y.

Now let A^{a} be the mutation of A defined by a. The identity element of A^{a} is a^{−1}. Moreover, an invertible element c in A is also invertible in A^{a} with inverse Q(a)^{−1} c^{−1}.

Let x = Q(a)^{−1}b in A^{a}. It is invertible in A, as is a^{−1} – Q(a)^{−1}b = Q(a)^{−1}(a – b). So by the special case of Hua's identity for x in A^{a}

$$\displaystyle{a^{-1}= Q(a)^{-1}(a^{-1} - Q(a)^{-1}b)^{-1} + Q(a)^{-1}(a^{-1} - b^{-1})^{-1}= (a -b)^{-1} + (a-Q(a)b^{-1})^{-1}.}$$

== Bergman operator ==
If A is a unital Jordan algebra, the Bergman operator is defined for a, b in A by

$$\displaystyle{B(a,b) = I - R(a,b) + Q(a)Q(b).}$$

If a is invertible then

$$\displaystyle{B(a,b)=Q(a)Q(a^{-1}-b);}$$

while if b is invertible then

$$\displaystyle{B(a,b)=Q(a-b^{-1})Q(b).}$$

In fact if a is invertible

Q(a)Q(a^{−1} − b) = Q(a)[Q(a^{−1} − 2Q(a^{−1},b) + Q(b)]=I − 2Q(a)Q(a^{−1},b) + Q(a)Q(b)=I − R(a,b) + Q(a)Q(b)

and similarly if b is invertible.

More generally the Bergman operator satisfies a version of the commutation or homotopy identity:

$$\displaystyle{B(a,b)Q(a)=Q(a)B(b,a)=Q(a-Q(a)b)}$$

and a version of the fundamental identity:

$$\displaystyle{Q(B(a,b)c)=B(a,b)Q(c)B(b,a).}$$

There is also a third more technical identity:

$$\displaystyle{2Q(B(a,b)c,a-Q(a)b) =B(a,b)(2Q(a,c) - R(c,b)Q(a))=(2Q(a,c)-Q(a)R(b,c))B(b,a).}$$

== Quasi-invertibility ==
Let A be a finite-dimensional unital Jordan algebra over a field k of characteristic ≠ 2. For a pair (a,b) with a and a^{−1} − b invertible define

$$\displaystyle{a^b= (a^{-1}-b)^{-1}.}$$

In this case the Bergman operator B(a,b) = Q(a)Q(a^{−1} − b) defines an invertible operator on A and

$$\displaystyle{a^b = B(a,b)^{-1}(a-Q(a)b).}$$

In fact

$$\displaystyle{B(a,b)^{-1}(a-Q(a)b)= Q(a^b)Q(a^{-1})(a-Q(a)b)=Q(a^b)(a^b)^{-1}=a^b.}$$

Moreover, by definition a^{−1} − b − c is invertible if and only if (a^{b})^{−1} − c is invertible. In that case

$$\displaystyle{a^{b+c}=(a^b)^c.}$$

Indeed,

$$\displaystyle{a^{b+c}=((a^{-1} - b) -c)^{-1} = ((a^b)^{-1} -c)^{-1}=(a^b)^c.}$$

The assumption that a be invertible can be dropped since a^{b} can be defined only supposing that the Bergman operator B(a,b) is invertible. The pair (a,b) is then said to be quasi-invertible. In that case a^{b} is defined by the formula

$$\displaystyle{a^b = B(a,b)^{-1}(a-Q(a)b).}$$

If B(a,b) is invertible, then B(a,b)c = 1 for some c. The fundamental identity implies that B(a,b)Q(c)B(b,a) = I. So by finite-dimensionality B(b,a) is invertible. Thus (a,b) is invertible if and only if (b,a) is invertible and in this case

$$\displaystyle{a^b = a +Q(a)b^a.}$$

In fact

B(a,b)(a + Q(a)b^{a}) = a − 2R(a,b)a + Q(a)Q(b)a + Q(a)(b − Q(b)a) = a − Q(a)b,

so the formula follows by applying B(a,b)^{−1} to both sides.

As before (a,b+c) is quasi-invertible if and only if (a^{b},c) is quasi-invertible; and in that case

$$\displaystyle{a^{b+c}=(a^b)^c.}$$

If k = R or C, this would follow by continuity from the special case where a and a^{−1} − b were invertible. In general the proof requires four identities for the Bergman operator:

- $\displaystyle{B(a,b)Q(a^b) = Q(a^b)B(b,a)=Q(a)}$
- $\displaystyle{B(a,b)Q(a^b,c) + Q(a)R(b,c) =Q(a^b,c)B(b,a) + R(c,b)Q(a) =Q(a,c)}$
- $\displaystyle{B(a,b)R(a^b,c)=R(a,c) -2Q(a)Q(b,c)}$
- $\displaystyle{ B(a,b)B(a^b,c)=B(a,b+c)}$

In fact applying Q to the identity B(a,b)a^{b} = a − Q(a)b yields

$$\displaystyle{B(a,b)Q(a^b)B(b,a)=B(a,b)Q(a)=Q(a)B(b,a).}$$

The first identity follows by cancelling B(a,b) and B(b,a). The second identity follows by similar cancellation in

B(a,b)Q(a^{b},c)B(b,a) = Q(B(a,b)a^{b},B(a,b)c) = Q(a − Q(a)b,B(a,b)c) = B(a,b)(Q(a,c) − R(c,b)Q(a)) = (Q(a,c) − Q(a)R(b,c))B(b,a).

The third identity follows by applying the second identity to an element d and then switching the roles of c and d. The fourth follows because

B(a,b)B(a^{b},c) = B(a,b)(I − R(a^{b},c) + Q(a^{b})Q(c)) = I − R(a,b + c) + Q(a) Q(b + c) = B(a,b+c).

In fact (a,b) is quasi-invertible if and only if a is quasi-invertible in the mutation A^{b}. Since this mutation might not necessarily unital this means that when an identity is adjoint 1 − a becomes invertible in A^{b} ⊕ k1. This condition can be expressed as follows without mentioning the mutation or homotope:

(a,b) is quasi-invertible if and only if there is an element c such that B(a,b)c = a − Q(a)b and B(a,b)Q(c)b = Q(a)b. In this case c = a^{b}.

In fact if (a,b) is quasi-invertible, then c = a^{b} satisfies the first identity by definition. The second follows because B(a,b)Q(a^{b}) = Q(a). Conversely the conditions state that in A^{b} ⊕ k1 the conditions imply that 1 + c is the inverse of 1 − a. On the other hand, ( 1 − a) ∘ x = B(a,b)x for x in A^{b}. Hence B(a,b) is invertible.

== Equivalence relation ==
Let A be a finite-dimensional unital Jordan algebra over a field k of characteristic ≠ 2. Two pairs (a_{i},b_{i}) with a_{i} invertible are said to be equivalent if (a_{1})^{−1} − b_{1} + b_{2} is invertible and a_{2} = (a_{1})^{b_{1} − b_{2}}.

This is an equivalence relation, since if a is invertible a^{0} = a so that a pair (a,b) is equivalent to itself. It is symmetric since from the definition a_{1} = (a_{2})^{b_{2} − b_{1}}. It is transitive. For suppose that (a_{3},b_{3}) is a third pair with (a_{2})^{−1} − b_{2} + b_{3} invertible and a_{3} = (a_{2})^{b_{2} − b_{3}}. From the above

$$\displaystyle{a_1^{-1} - b_1 + b_3= (a_1^{-1} - b_1 +b_2) -b_2 + b_3=a_2^{-1} -b_2+b_3}$$

is invertible and

$$\displaystyle{a_3=a_2^{b_2-b_3}=(a_1^{b_1-b_2})^{b_2-b_3}=a_1^{b_1-b_3}.}$$

As for quasi-invertibility, this definition can be extended to the case where a and a^{−1} − b are not assumed to be invertible.

Two pairs (a_{i},b_{i}) are said to be equivalent if (a_{1}, b_{1} − b_{2}) is quasi-invertible and a_{2} = (a_{1})^{b_{1} − b_{2}}. When k = R or C, the fact that this more general definition also gives an equivalence relation can deduced from the invertible case by continuity. For general k, it can also be verified directly:

- The relation is reflexive since (a,0) is quasi-invertible and a^{0} = a.
- The relation is symmetric, since a_{1} = (a_{2})^{b_{2} − b_{1}}.
- The relation is transitive. For suppose that (a_{3},b_{3}) is a third pair with (a_{2}, b_{2} − b_{3}) quasi-invertible and a_{3} = (a_{2})^{b_{2} − b_{3}}. In this case

$$\displaystyle{B(a_1,b_1-b_3)=B(a_1,b_1-b_2)B(a_2,b_2-b_3),}$$

so that (a_{1},b_{1} − b_{3}) is quasi-invertible with

$$\displaystyle{a_3=a_2^{b_2-b_3}=(a_1^{b_1-b_2})^{b_2-b_3}=a_1^{b_1-b_3}.}$$

The equivalence class of (a,b) is denoted by (a:b).

== Structure groups ==
Let A be a finite-dimensional complex semisimple unital Jordan algebra. If T is an operator on A, let T^{t} be its transpose with respect to the trace form. Thus L(a)^{t} = L(a), Q(a)^{t} = Q(a), R(a,b)^{t} = R(b,a) and B(a,b)^{t} = B(b,a). The structure group of A consists of g in GL(A) such that

$$\displaystyle{Q(ga)=gQ(a)g^t.}$$

They form a group Γ(A). The automorphism group Aut A of A consists of invertible complex linear operators g such that L(ga) = gL(a)g^{−1} and g1 = 1. Since an automorphism g preserves the trace form, g^{−1} = g^{t}.

- The structure group is closed under taking transposes g ↦ g^{t} and adjoints g ↦ g*.
- The structure group contains the automorphism group. The automorphism group can be identified with the stabilizer of 1 in the structure group.
- If a is invertible, Q(a) lies in the structure group.
- If g is in the structure group and a is invertible, ga is also invertible with (ga)^{−1} = (g^{t})^{−1}a^{−1}.
- The structure group Γ(A) acts transitively on the set of invertible elements in A.
- Every g in Γ(A) has the form g = h Q(a) with h an automorphism and a invertible.

The complex Jordan algebra A is the complexification of a real Euclidean Jordan algebra E, for which the trace form defines an inner product. There is an associated involution a ↦ a* on A which gives rise to a complex inner product on A. The unitary structure group Γ_{u}(A) is the subgroup of Γ(A) consisting of unitary operators, so that Γ_{u}(A) = Γ(A) ∩ U(A). The identity component of Γ_{u}(A) is denoted by K. It is a connected closed subgroup of U(A).

- The stabilizer of 1 in Γ_{u}(A) is Aut E.
- Every g in Γ_{u}(A) has the form g = h Q(u) with h in Aut E and u invertible in A with u* = u^{−1}.
- Γ(A) is the complexification of Γ_{u}(A).
- The set S of invertible elements u in A such that u* = u^{−1} can be characterized equivalently either as those u for which L(u) is a normal operator with uu* = 1 or as those u of the form exp ia for some a in E. In particular S is connected.
- The identity component of Γ_{u}(A) acts transitively on S
- Given a Jordan frame (e_{i}) and v in A, there is an operator u in the identity component of Γ_{u}(A) such that uv = Σ α_{i} e_{i} with α_{i} ≥ 0. If v is invertible, then α_{i} > 0.

The structure group Γ(A) acts naturally on X. For g in Γ(A), set

$$\displaystyle{g(a,b)=(ga,(g^t)^{-1}b).}$$

Then (x,y) is quasi-invertible if and only if (gx,(g^{t})^{−1}y) is quasi-invertible and

$$\displaystyle{g(x^y)=(gx)^{(g^t)^{-1}y}.}$$

In fact the covariance relations for g with Q and the inverse imply that

$$\displaystyle{gB(x,y)g^{-1}=B(gx,(g^t)^{-1}y)}$$

if x is invertible and so everywhere by density. In turn this implies the relation for the quasi-inverse. If a is invertible then Q(a) lies in Γ(A) and if (a,b) is quasi-invertible B(a,b) lies in Γ(A). So both types of operators act on X.

The defining relations for the structure group show that it is a closed subgroup of $\mathfrak{g}_0$ of GL(A). Since Q(e^{a}) = e^{2L(a)}, the corresponding complex Lie algebra contains the operators L(a). The commutators [L(a),L(b)] span the complex Lie algebra of derivations of A. The operators R(a,b) = [L(a),L(b)] + L(ab) span $\mathfrak{g}_0$ and satisfy R(a,b)^{t} = R(b,a) and [R(a,b),R(c,d)]=R(R(a,b)c,d) − R(c,R(b,a)d).

== Geometric properties of quotient space ==
Let A be a finite-dimensional complex unital Jordan algebra which is semisimple, i.e. the trace form Tr L(ab) is non-degenerate. Let X be the quotient of A×A by the equivalence relation. Let X_{b} be the subset of X of classes (a:b). The map φ_{b}:X_{b} → A, (a:b) ↦ a is injective. A subset U of X is defined to be open if and only if U ∩ X_{b} is open for all b.

X is a complex manifold.

The transition maps of the atlas with charts φ_{b} are given by

$$\displaystyle{\varphi_{cb}=\varphi_c\circ\varphi_b^{-1}:\varphi_b(X_b\cap X_c)\rightarrow \varphi_c(X_b\cap X_c).}$$

and are injective and holomorphic since

$$\displaystyle{\varphi_{cb}(a)=a^{b-c}}$$

with derivative

$$\displaystyle{\varphi_{cb}^\prime(a)=B(a,b-c)^{-1}.}$$

This defines the structure of a complex manifold on X because φ_{dc} ∘ φ_{cb} = φ_{db} on φ_{b}(X_{b} ∩ X_{c} ∩ X_{d}).

Given a finite set of points (a_{i}:b_{i}) in X, they are contained in a common X_{b}.

Indeed, all the polynomial functions p_{i}(b) = det B(a_{i},b_{i} − b) are non-trivial since p_{i}(b_{i}) = 1. Therefore, there is a b such that p_{i}(b) ≠ 0 for all i, which is precisely the criterion for (a_{i}:b_{i}) to lie in X_{b}.

X is compact.

Loos (1977) uses the Bergman operators to construct an explicit biholomorphism between X and a closed smooth algebraic subvariety of complex projective space. This implies in particular that X is compact. There is a more direct proof of compactness using symmetry groups.

Given a Jordan frame (e_{i}) in E, for every a in A there is a k in U = Γ_{u}(A) such that a=k(Σ α_{i} e_{i}) with α_{i} ≥ 0 (and α_{i} > 0 if a is invertible). In fact, if (a,b) is in X then it is equivalent to k(c,d) with c and d in the unital Jordan subalgebra A_{e} = ⊕ Ce_{i}, which is the complexification of E_{e} = ⊕ Re_{i}. Let Z be the complex manifold constructed for A_{e}. Because A_{e} is a direct sum of copies of C, Z is just a product of Riemann spheres, one for each e_{i}. In particular it is compact. There is a natural map of Z into X which is continuous. Let Y be the image of Z. It is compact and therefore coincides with the closure of Y_{0} = A_{e} ⊂ A = X_{0}. The set U⋅Y is the continuous image of the compact set U × Y. It is therefore compact. On the other hand, U⋅Y_{0} = X_{0}, so it contains a dense subset of X and must therefore coincide with X. So X is compact.

The above argument shows that every (a,b) in X is equivalent to k(c,d) with c and d in A_{e} and k in Γ_{u}(A). The mapping of Z into X is in fact an embedding. This is a consequence of (x,y) being quasi-invertible in A_{e} if and only if it is quasi-invertible in A. Indeed, if B(x,y) is injective on A, its restriction to A_{e} is also injective. Conversely, the two equations for the quasi-inverse in A_{e} imply that it is also a quasi-inverse in A.

== Möbius transformations ==
Let A be a finite-dimensional complex semisimple unital Jordan algebra. The group SL(2,C) acts by Möbius transformation on the Riemann sphere C ∪ {∞}, the one-point compactification of C. If g in SL(2,C) is given by the matrix

$$\displaystyle{g=\begin{pmatrix}\alpha & \beta \\ \gamma & \delta\end{pmatrix},}$$

then

$$\displaystyle{g(z)=(\alpha z +\beta)(\gamma z +\delta)^{-1}.}$$

There is a generalization of this action of SL(2,C) to A and its compactification X. In order to define this action, note that SL(2,C) is generated by the three subgroups of lower and upper unitriangular matrices and the diagonal matrices. It is also generated by the lower (or upper) unitriangular matrices, the diagonal matrices and the matrix

$$\displaystyle{J=\begin{pmatrix}0 & 1 \\ -1 & 0\end{pmatrix}.}$$

The matrix J corresponds to the Möbius transformation j(z) = −z^{−1} and can be written

$$\displaystyle{J=\begin{pmatrix}1 & 0 \\ -1 & 1\end{pmatrix}\begin{pmatrix}1 & 1 \\ 0 & 1\end{pmatrix}
\begin{pmatrix}1 & 0 \\ -1 & 1\end{pmatrix}.}$$

The Möbius transformations fixing ∞ are just the upper triangular matrices. If g does not fix ∞, it sends ∞ to a finite point a. But then g can be composed with an upper unitriangular to send a to 0 and then with J to send 0 to infinity.

For an element a of A, the action of g in SL(2,C) is defined by the same formula

$$\displaystyle{g(a)=(\alpha a +\beta 1)(\gamma a +\delta 1)^{-1}.}$$

This defines an element of C[a] provided that γa + δ1 is invertible in A. The action is thus defined everywhere on A if g is upper triangular. On the other hand, the action on X is simple to define for lower triangular matrices.

- For diagonal matrices g with diagonal entries α and α^{−1}, g(a,b) = (α^{2}a, α^{−2}b) is a well-defined holomorphic action on A^{2} which passes to the quotient X. On X_{0} = A it agrees with the Möbius action.
- For lower unitriangular matrices, with off-diagonal parameter γ, define g(a,b) = (a,b − γ1). Again this is holomorphic on A^{2} and passes to the quotient X. When b = 0 and γ ≠ 0,

$$\displaystyle{g(a:0)=(a:-\gamma)= (a^{-\gamma}:0)= (a(\gamma a +1 )^{-1}:0)}$$

if γa + 1 is invertible, so this is an extension of the Möbius action.

- For upper unitriangular matrices, with off-diagonal parameter β, the action on X_{0} = (A:0) is defined by g(a,0) = (a + β1). Loos (1977) showed that this defined a complex one-parameter flow on A. The corresponding holomorphic complex vector field extended to X, so that the action on the compact complex manifold X could be defined by the associated complex flow. A simpler method is to note that the operator J can be implemented directly using its intertwining relations with the unitary structure group.

In fact on the invertible elements in A, the operator j(a) = −a^{−1} satisfies j(ga) = (g^{t})^{−1}j(a). To define a biholomorphism j on X such that j ∘ g = (g^{t})^{−1} ∘ j, it is enough to define these for (a:b) in some suitable orbit of Γ(A) or Γ_{u}(A). On the other hand, as indicated above, given a Jordan frame (e_{i}) in E, for every a in A there is a k in U = Γ_{u}(A) such that a=k(Σ α_{i} e_{i}) with α_{i} ≥ 0.

The computation of j in the associative commutative algebra A_{e} is straightforward since it is a direct product. For c = Σ α_{i} e_{i} and d = Σ β_{i} e_{i}, the Bergman operator on A_{e} has determinant det B(c,d) = Π(1 − α_{i}β_{i})^{2}. In particular det B(c,d − λ) ≠ 0 for some λ ≠ 0. So that (c,d) is equivalent to (x,λ). Let μ = −λ^{−1}. On A, for a dense set of a, the pair (a,λ) is equivalent to (b,0) with b invertible. Then (−b^{−1},0) is equivalent to (μ − μ^{2}a,μ). Since a ↦ μ − μ^{2}a is holomorphic it follows that j has a unique continuous extension to X such that j ∘ g = (g^{t})^{−1} ∘ j for g in Γ(A), the extension is holomorphic and for λ ≠ 0, μ = −λ^{−1}

$$\displaystyle{j(a,\lambda)=(\mu -\mu^2a,\mu).}$$

The holomorphic transformations corresponding to upper unitriangular matrices can be defined using the fact that they are the conjugates by J of lower unitriangular matrices, for which the action is already known. A direct algebraic construction is given in Dineen, Mackey & Mellon (1999).

This action of SL(2,C) is compatible with inclusions. More generally if e_{1}, ..., e_{m} is a Jordan frame, there is an action of SL(2,C)^{m} on A_{e} which extends to A. If c = Σ γ_{i}e_{i} and b = Σ β_{i}e_{i}, then S(c) and T(b) give the action of the product of the lower and upper unitriangular matrices. If a = Σ α_{i}e_{i} is invertible, the corresponding product of diagonal matrices act as W = Q(a). In particular the diagonal matrices give an action of (C*)^{m} and T^{m}.

== Holomorphic symmetry group ==
Let A be a finite-dimensional complex semisimple unital Jordan algebra. There is a transitive holomorphic action of a complex matrix group G on the compact complex manifold X. Koecher (1967) described G analogously to SL(2,C) in terms of generators and relations. G acts on the corresponding finite-dimensional Lie algebra of holomorphic vector fields restricted to X_{0} = A, so that G is realized as a closed matrix group. It is the complexification of a compact Lie group without center, so a semisimple algebraic group. The identity component H of the compact group acts transitively on X, so that X can be identified as a Hermitian symmetric space of compact type.

The group G is generated by three types of holomorphic transformation on X:

- Operators W corresponding to elements W in Γ(A) given by W(a,b) = (Wa, (W^{t})^{−1}b). These were already described above. On X_{0} = A, they are given by a ↦ Wa.
- Operators S_{c} defined by S_{c}(a,b) = (a,b + c). These are the analogue of lower unitriangular matrices and form a subgroup isomorphic to the additive group of A, with the given parametrization. Again these act holomorphically on A^{2} and the action passes to the quotient X. On A the action is given by a ↦ a^{c} if (a,c) is quasi-invertible.
- The transformation j corresponding to J in SL(2,C). It was constructed above as part of the action of PSL(2,C) = SL(2,C)/{±I} on X. On invertible elements in A it is given by a ↦ −a^{−1}.

The operators W normalize the group of operators S_{c}. Similarly the operator j normalizes the structure group, j ∘ W = (W^{t})^{−1} ∘ j. The operators T_{c} = j ∘ S_{−c} ∘ j also form a group of holomorphic transformations isomorphic to the additive group of A. They generalize the upper unitriangular subgroup of SL(2,C). This group is normalized by the operators W of the structure group. The operator T_{c} acts on A as a ↦ a + c. If c is a scalar the operators S_{c} and T_{c} coincide with the operators corresponding to lower and upper unitriangular matrices in SL(2,C). Accordingly, there is a relation j = S_{1} ∘ T_{1} ∘ S_{1} and PSL(2,C) is a subgroup of G. Loos (1977) defines the operators T_{c} in terms of the flow associated to a holomorphic vector field on X, while Dineen, Mackey & Mellon (1999) give a direct algebraic description.

G acts transitively on X.

Indeed, S_{b}T_{a}(0:0) = (a:b).

Let G_{−1} and G_{+1} be the complex Abelian groups formed by the symmetries T_{c} and S_{c} respectively. Let G_{0} = Γ(A).

$$\displaystyle{G=G_0G_{+1}G_{-1}G_{+1}=G_0G_{-1}G_{+1}G_{-1}.}$$

The two expressions for G are equivalent as follows by conjugating by j.

For a invertible, Hua's identity can be rewritten

$$\displaystyle{Q(a)=T_a \circ j \circ T_{a^{-1}}\circ j \circ T_a \circ j.}$$

Moreover, j = S_{1} ∘ T_{1} ∘ S_{1} and S_{c} = j ∘ T_{−c} ∘ j.

The convariance relations show that the elements of G fall into sets G_{0}G_{1}, G_{0}G_{1}jG_{1}, G_{0}G_{1}jG_{1}jG_{1}, G_{0}G_{1}jG_{1}jG_{1}jG_{1}. ... The first expression for G follows once it is established that no new elements appear in the fourth or subsequent sets. For this it suffices to show that

j ∘ G_{1} ∘j ∘ G_{1} ∘j ⊆ G_{0} G_{1} ∘j ∘ G_{1} ∘ j ∘ G_{1}.

For then if there are three or more occurrences of j, the number can be recursively reduced to two. Given a, b in A, pick λ ≠ 0 so that c = a − λ and d = b − λ^{−1} are invertible. Then

$$\displaystyle{j T_a j  T_b  j =  j  T_c  T_\lambda  j  T_{\lambda^{-1}}  T_d \circ j = \lambda^2 j T_c  j  T_{-\lambda}  j T_d \ j = \lambda^2 T_{-c^{-1}} j Q(c^{-1})T_{-c^{-1} -\lambda - d^{-1}} j Q(d^{-1})jT_{-d^{-1}},}$$

which lies in G_{0}G_{1} ∘ j ∘ G_{1} ∘ j ∘ G_{1}.

The stabilizer of (0:0) in G is G_{0}G_{−1}.

It suffices to check that if S_{a}T_{b}(0:0) = (0:0), then b = 0. If so (b:0) = (0: −a) = (0:0), so b = 0.

== Exchange relations ==
G is generated by G_{±1}.

For a invertible, Hua's identity can be rewritten

$$\displaystyle{Q(a)=T_a \circ j \circ T_{a^{-1}}\circ j \circ T_a \circ j.}$$

Since j = S_{1} ∘ T_{1} ∘ S_{1}, the operators Q(a) belong to the group generated by G_{±1}.

For quasi-invertible pairs (a,b), there are the "exchange relations"

S_{b}T_{a} = T_{a^{b}}B(a,b)^{−1}S_{b^{a}}.

This identity shows that B(a,b) is in the group generated by G_{±1}. Taking inverses, it is equivalent to the identity T_{a}S_{b} = S_{b^{a}}B(a,b)T_{a^{b}}.

To prove the exchange relations, it suffices to check that it valid when applied to points the dense set of points (c:0) in X for which (a+c,b) is quasi-invertible. It then reduces to the identity:

$$\displaystyle{(a+c)^b= a^b + B(a,b)^{-1}c^{(b^a)}.}$$

In fact, if (a,b) is quasi-invertible, then (a + c,b) is quasi-invertible if and only if (c,b^{a}) is quasi-invertible. This follows because (x,y) is quasi-invertible if and only if (y,x) is. Moreover, the above formula holds in this case.

For the proof, two more identities are required:

$$\displaystyle{B(c+b,a)=B(c,a^b)B(b,a)}$$
$$\displaystyle{R(a,b)=R(a^b,b-Q(b)a)=R(a-Q(a)b,b^a)}$$

The first follows from a previous identity by applying the transpose. For the second, because of the transpose, it suffices to prove the first equality. Setting c = b − Q(b)a in the identity B(a,b)R(a^{b},c) = R(a,c) − Q(a)Q(b,c) yields

B(a,b)R(a^{b},b − Q(b)c) = B(a,b)R(a,b),

so the identity follows by cancelling B(a,b).

To prove the formula, the relations (a + c)^{b} = B(a,c)^{−1}(a + c − Q(a + c)b) and a^{b} + B(a,b)^{−1}c^{(b^{a})} = B(a + c,b)^{−1}(B(c,b^{a}) (a − Q(a)b) + c − Q(c)b^{a}) show that it is enough to prove that

a + c − Q(a + c)b = B(c,b^{a}) (a − Q(a)b) + c − Q(c)b^{a}.

Indeed, B(c,b^{a}) (a − Q(a)b) + c − Q(c)b^{a} = a + c − Q(a)b + 2R(c,b^{a})(a − Q(a)b) − Q(c)[ b^{a} − Q(b^{a})(a − Q(a)b)]. On the other hand, 2R(c,b^{a})(a − Q(a)b) = 2R(c,a − Q(a)b)b^{a} = R(a,b)c = 2Q(a,c)b and b^{a} − Q(b^{a})(a − Q(a)b) = b^{a} − Q(b)B(a,b)^{−1}(a − Q(a)b) = b^{a} − Q(b)a^{b} = b. So B(c,b^{a}) (a − Q(a)b) + c − Q(c)b^{a} = a + c − Q(a)b − 2Q(a,c)b − Q(c)b = a + c − Q(a + c)b.

Now set Ω = G_{+1}G_{0}G_{−1}. Then the exchange relations imply that S_{b} T_{a} lies in Ω if and only if (a,b) is quasi-invertible; and that g lies in Ω if and only if g(0:0) is in X_{0}.

In fact if S_{b} T_{a} lies in Ω, then (a,b) is equivalent to (x,0), so it a quasi-invertible pair; the converse follows from the exchange relations. Clearly Ω(0:0) = G_{1}(0:0) = X_{0}. The converse follows from G = G_{−1}G_{1} G_{0}G_{−1} and the criterion for S_{b} T_{a} to lie in Ω.

== Lie algebra of holomorphic vector fields ==
The compact complex manifold X is modelled on the space A. The derivatives of the transition maps describe the tangent bundle through holomorphic transition functions F_{bc}:X_{b} ∩ X_{c} → GL(A). These are given by F_{bc}(a,b) = B(a,b − c), so the structure group of the corresponding principal fiber bundle reduces to Γ(A), the structure group of A. The corresponding holomorphic vector bundle with fibre A is the tangent bundle of the complex manifold X. Its holomorphic sections are just holomorphic vector fields on X. They can be determined directly using the fact that they must be invariant under the natural adjoint action of the known holomorphic symmetries of X. They form a finite-dimensional complex semisimple Lie algebra. The restriction of these vector fields to X_{0} can be described explicitly. A direct consequence of this description is that the Lie algebra is three-graded and that the group of holomorphic symmetries of X, described by generators and relations in Koecher (1967) and Loos (1979), is a complex linear semisimple algebraic group that coincides with the group of biholomorphisms of X.

The Lie algebras of the three subgroups of holomorphic automorphisms of X give rise to linear spaces of holomorphic vector fields on X and hence X_{0} = A.

- The structure group Γ(A) has Lie algebra $\mathfrak{g}_0$ spanned by the operators R(x,y). These define a complex Lie algebra of linear vector fields a ↦ R(x,y)a on A.
- The translation operators act on A as T_{c}(a) = a + c. The corresponding one-parameter subgroups are given by T_{tc} and correspond to the constant vector fields a ↦ c. These give an Abelian Lie algebra $\mathfrak{g}_{-1}$ of vector fields on A.
- The operators S_{c} defined on X by S_{c}(a,b) = (a,b − c). The corresponding one-parameter groups S_{tc} define quadratic vector fields a ↦ Q(a)c on A. These give an Abelian Lie algebra $\mathfrak{g}_{1}$ of vector fields on A.

Let

$$\displaystyle{\mathfrak{g}=\mathfrak{g}_{-1}\oplus\mathfrak{g}_0\oplus\mathfrak{g}_1.}$$

Then, defining $\mathfrak{g}_i = (0)$ for i ≠ −1, 0, 1, $\mathfrak{g}$ forms a complex Lie algebra with

$$\displaystyle{[\mathfrak{g}_p,\mathfrak{g}_q]\subseteq \mathfrak{g}_{p+q}}.$$

This gives the structure of a 3-graded Lie algebra. For elements (a,T,b) in $\mathfrak{g}$, the Lie bracket is given by

$$\displaystyle{[(a_1,T_1,b_1),(a_2,T_2,b_2)]=(T_1a_2-T_2a_1,[T_1,T_2]+R(a_1,b_2)-R(a_2,b_1),T_2^tb_1-T_1^tb_2)}$$

The group PSL(2,C) of Möbius transformations of X normalizes the Lie algebra $\mathfrak{g}$. The transformation j(z) = −z^{−1} corresponding to the Weyl group element J induces the involutive automorphism σ given by

$$\displaystyle{\sigma(a,T,b)=(b,-T^t,a).}$$

More generally the action of a Möbius transformation

$$\displaystyle{g=\begin{pmatrix}\alpha & \beta \\ \gamma & \delta\end{pmatrix}}$$

can be described explicitly. In terms of generators diagonal matrices act as

$$\displaystyle{\begin{pmatrix}\alpha & 0 \\ 0 & \alpha^{-1}\end{pmatrix}(a,T,b)=(\alpha^2 a,T,\alpha^{-2}b),}$$

upper unitriangular matrices act as

$$\displaystyle{\begin{pmatrix}1 & \beta \\ 0 & 1\end{pmatrix}(a,T,b)=(a +\beta T(1) -\beta^2 b,T - \beta L(a),b),}$$

and lower unitriangular matrices act as

$$\displaystyle{\begin{pmatrix}1 & 0 \\ \gamma & 1\end{pmatrix}(a,T,b)=(a,T-\gamma L(b),b-\gamma T^t(1) -\gamma^2 a).}$$

This can be written uniformly in matrix notation as

$$\displaystyle{\begin{pmatrix}g(T) & g(a) \\ g(b) & g(T)^t\end{pmatrix}= g \begin{pmatrix}T & a \\ b & T^t\end{pmatrix} g^{-1}.}$$

In particular the grading corresponds to the action of the diagonal subgroup of SL(2,C), even with |α| = 1, so a copy of T.

The Killing form is given by

$$\displaystyle{\mathbf{{B}}((a_1,T_1,b_1),(a_2,T_2,b_2))= (a_1,b_2) + (b_1,a_2) +  \beta(T_1,T_2),}$$

where β(T_{1},T_{2}) is the symmetric bilinear form defined by

$$\displaystyle{\beta(R(a,b),R(c,d))=(R(a,b)c,d)=(R(c,d)a,b),}$$

with the bilinear form (a,b) corresponding to the trace form: (a,b) = Tr L(ab).

More generally the generators of the group G act by automorphisms on $\mathfrak{g}$ as

- $\displaystyle{W(a,T,b)=(Wa,WTW^{-1},(W^t)^{-1}b),}$
- $\displaystyle{J(a,T,b)=(-b,-T^t,-a),}$
- $\displaystyle{T_x(a,T,b)=(a+Tx -Q(x)b, T-R(x,b),b),}$
- $\displaystyle{S_y(a,T,b)=(a,T-R(a,y),b-T^ty-Q(y)a).}$

The Killing form is nondegenerate on $\mathfrak{g}$.

The nondegeneracy of the Killing form is immediate from the explicit formula. By Cartan's criterion, $\mathfrak{g}$ is semisimple. In the next section the group G is realized as the complexification of a connected compact Lie group H with trivial center, so semisimple. This gives a direct means to verify semisimplicity. The group H also acts transitively on X.

$\mathfrak{g}$ is the Lie algebra of all holomorphic vector fields on X.

To prove that $\mathfrak{g}$ exhausts the holomorphic vector fields on X, note the group T acts on holomorphic vector fields. The restriction of such a vector field to X_{0} = A gives a holomorphic map of A into A. The power series expansion around 0 is a convergent sum of homogeneous parts of degree m ≥ 0. The action of T scales the part of degree m by α^{2m − 2}. By taking Fourier coefficients with respect to T, the part of degree m is also a holomorphic vector field. Since conjugation by J gives the inverse on T, it follows that the only possible degrees are 0, 1 and 2. Degree 0 is accounted for by the constant fields. Since conjugation by J interchanges degree 0 and degree 2, it follows that $\mathfrak{g}_{\pm 1}$ account for all these holomorphic vector fields. Any further holomorphic vector field would have to appear in degree 1 and so would have the form a ↦ Ma for some M in End A. Conjugation by J would give another such map N. Moreover, e^{tM}(a,0,0)= (e^{tM}a,0,0). But then

$$\displaystyle{e^{tM}(0,0,b)=Je^{tN}J(0,0,b)=Je^{tN}(b,0,0)=(0,0,e^{tN}b).}$$

Set U_{t} = e^{tM} and V_{t} = e^{tB}. Then

$$\displaystyle{Q(U_ta)b = U_tQ(a)V_{-t}b.}$$

It follows that U_{t} lies in Γ(A) for all t and hence that M lies in $\mathfrak{g}_0$. So $\mathfrak{g}$ is exactly the space of holomorphic vector fields on X.

== Compact real form ==
The action of G on $\mathfrak{g}$ is faithful.

Suppose g = WT_{x}S_{y} T_{z} acts trivially on $\mathfrak{g}$. Then S_{y} T_{z} must leave the subalgebra (0,0,A) invariant. Hence so must S_{y}. This forces y = 0, so that g = WT_{x + z}. But then T_{x+z} must leave the subalgebra (A,0,0) invariant, so that x + z = 0 and g = W. If W acts trivially, W = I.

The group G can thus be identified with its image in GL $\mathfrak{g}$.

Let A = E + iE be the complexification of a Euclidean Jordan algebra E. For a = x + iy, set a* = x − iy. The trace form on E defines a complex inner product on A and hence an adjoint operation. The unitary structure group Γ_{u}(A) consists of those g in Γ(A) that are in U(A), i.e. satisfy gg*=g*g = I. It is a closed subgroup of U(A). Its Lie algebra consists of the skew-adjoint elements in $\mathfrak{g}_0$. Define a conjugate linear involution θ on $\mathfrak{g}$ by

$$\displaystyle{\theta(a,T,b)=(b^*,-T^*, a^*).}$$

This is a period 2 conjugate-linear automorphism of the Lie algebra. It induces an automorphism of G, which on the generators is given by

$$\displaystyle{\theta(S_a)=T_{a^*},\,\,\, \theta(j)=j,\,\,\, \theta(T_b)=S_{b^*},\,\,\, \theta(W)=(W^*)^{-1}.}$$

Let H be the fixed point subgroup of θ in G. Let $\mathfrak{h}$ be the fixed point subalgebra of θ in $\mathfrak{g}$. Define a sesquilinear form on $\mathfrak{g}$ by (a,b) = −B(a,θ(b)). This defines a complex inner product on $\mathfrak{g}$ which restricts to a real inner product on $\mathfrak{h}$. Both are preserved by H. Let K be the identity component of Γ_{u}(A). It lies in H. Let K_{e} = T^{m} be the diagonal torus associated with a Jordan frame in E. The action of SL(2,C)^{m} is compatible with θ which sends a unimodular matrix
$$\begin{pmatrix} \alpha & \beta\\ \gamma & \delta\end{pmatrix}$$
to
$$\begin{pmatrix} \overline{\delta} & -\overline{\gamma}\\ -\overline{\beta} & \overline{\alpha}\end{pmatrix}$$
. In particular this gives a homomorphism of SU(2)^{m} into H.

Now every matrix M in SU(2) can be written as a product

$$\displaystyle{M = \begin{pmatrix} \zeta_1 & 0\\ 0 & \zeta_1^{-1}\end{pmatrix}
\begin{pmatrix} \cos \varphi & \sin \varphi\\ -\sin \varphi & \cos \varphi\end{pmatrix}
\begin{pmatrix} \zeta_2 & 0\\ 0 & \zeta_2^{-1}\end{pmatrix}.}$$

The factor in the middle gives another maximal torus in SU(2) obtained by conjugating by J. If a = Σ α_{i}e_{i} with |α_{i}| = 1, then Q(a) gives the action of the diagonal torus T = T^{m} and corresponds to an element of K ⊆ H. The element J lies in SU(2)^{m} and its image is a Möbius transformation j lying in H. Thus S = j ∘ T ∘ j is another torus in H and T ∘ S ∘ T coincides with the image of SU(2)^{m}.

H acts transitively on X. The stabilizer of (0:0) is K. Furthermore H = KSK, so that H is a connected closed subgroup of the unitary group on $\mathfrak{g}$. Its Lie algebra is $\mathfrak{h}$.

Since Z = SU(2)^{m}(0:0) for the compact complex manifold corresponding to A^{e}, if follows that Y = T S (0:0), where Y is the image of Z. On the other hand, X = KY, so that X = KTS(0:0) = KS(0:0). On the other hand, the stabilizer of (0:0) in H is K, since the fixed point subgroup of G_{0}G_{−1} under θ is K. Hence H = KSK. In particular H is compact and connected since both K and S are. Because it is a closed subgroup of U $\mathfrak{g}$, it is a Lie group. It contains K and hence its Lie algebra contains the operators (0,T,0) with T* = −T. It contains the image of SU(2)^{m} and hence the elements (a,0,a*) with a in A_{e}. Since A = KA_{e} and (k^{t})^{−1}(a*) = (ka)*, it follows that the Lie algebra $\mathfrak{h}_1$ of H contains (a,0,a*) for all a in A. Thus it contains $\mathfrak{h}$.

They are equal because all skew-adjoint derivations of $\mathfrak{h}$ are inner. In fact, since H normalizes $\mathfrak{h}$ and the action by conjugation is faithful, the map of $\mathfrak{h}_1$ into the Lie algebra $\mathfrak{d}$ of derivations of $\mathfrak{h}$ is faithful. In particular $\mathfrak{h}$ has trivial center. To show that $\mathfrak{h}$ equals $\mathfrak{h}_1$, it suffices to show that $\mathfrak{d}$ coincides with $\mathfrak{h}$. Derivations on $\mathfrak{h}$ are skew-adjoint for the inner product given by minus the Killing form. Take the invariant inner product on $\mathfrak{d}$ given by −Tr D_{1}D_{2}. Since $\mathfrak{h}$ is invariant under $\mathfrak{d}$ so is its orthogonal complement. They are both ideals in $\mathfrak{d}$, so the Lie bracket between them must vanish. But then any derivation in the orthogonal complement would have 0 Lie bracket with $\mathfrak{h}$, so must be zero. Hence $\mathfrak{h}$ is the Lie algebra of H. (This also follows from a dimension count since dim X = dim H − dim K.)

G is isomorphic to a closed subgroup of the general linear group on $\mathfrak{g}$.

The formulas above for the action of W and S_{y} show that the image of G_{0}G_{−1} is closed in GL $\mathfrak{g}$. Since H acts transitively on X and the stabilizer of (0:0) in G is G_{0}G_{−1}, it follows that G = HG_{0}G_{−1}. The compactness of H and closedness of G_{0}G_{−1} implies that G is closed in GL $\mathfrak{g}$.

G is a connected complex Lie group with Lie algebra $\mathfrak{g}$. It is the complexification of H.

G is a closed subgroup of GL $\mathfrak{g}$ so a real Lie group. Since it contains G_{i} with i = 0 or ±1, its Lie algebra contains $\mathfrak{g}$. Since $\mathfrak{g}$ is the complexification of $\mathfrak{h}$, like $\mathfrak{h}$ all its derivations are inner and it has trivial center. Since the Lie algebra of G normalizes $\mathfrak{g}$ and o is the only element centralizing $\mathfrak{g}$, as in the compact case the Lie algebra of G must be $\mathfrak{g}$. (This can also be seen by a dimension count since dim X = dim G − dim G_{0}G_{−1}.) Since it is a complex subspace, G is a complex Lie group. It is connected because it is the continuous image of the connected set H × G_{0}G_{−1}. Since $\mathfrak{g}$ is the complexification of $\mathfrak{h}$, G is the complexification of H.

== Noncompact real form ==
For a in A the spectral norm ||a|| is defined to be max α_{i} if a = u Σ α_{i}e_{i} with α_{i} ≥ 0 and u in K. It is independent of choices and defines a norm on A. Let D be the set of a with ||a|| < 1 and let H* be the identity component of the closed subgroup of G carrying D onto itself. It is generated by K, the Möbius transformations in PSU(1,1) and the image of SU(1,1)^{m} corresponding to a Jordan frame. Let τ be the conjugate-linear period 2 automorphism of $\mathfrak{g}$ defined by

$$\displaystyle{\tau(a,T,b)=(-a^*,-T^*,-b^*).}$$

Let $\mathfrak{h}^*$ be the fixed point algebra of τ. It is the Lie algebra of H*. It induces a period 2 automorphism of G with fixed point subgroup H*. The group H* acts transitively on D. The stabilizer of 0 is K.

The noncompact real semisimple Lie group H* acts on X with an open orbit D. As with the action of SU(1,1) on the Riemann sphere, it has only finitely many orbits. This orbit structure can be explicitly described when the Jordan algebra A is simple. Let X_{0}(r,s) be the subset of A consisting of elements a = u Σ α_{i}a_{i} with exactly r of the α_{i} less than one and exactly s of them greater than one. Thus 0 ≤ r + s ≤ m. These sets are the intersections of the orbits X(r,s) of H* with X_{0}. The orbits with r + s = m are open. There is a unique compact orbit X(0,0). It is the Shilov boundary S of D consisting of elements e^{ix} with x in E, the underlying Euclidean Jordan algebra. X(p,q) is in the closure of X(r,s) if and only if p ≤ r and q ≤ s. In particular S is in the closure of every orbit.

== Jordan algebras with involution ==
The preceding theory describes irreducible Hermitian symmetric spaces of tube type in terms of unital Jordan algebras. In Loos (1977) general Hermitian symmetric spaces are described by a systematic extension of the above theory to Jordan pairs. In the development of Koecher (1969), however, irreducible Hermitian symmetric spaces not of tube type are described in terms of period two automorphisms of simple Euclidean Jordan algebras. In fact any period 2 automorphism defines a Jordan pair: the general results of Loos (1977) on Jordan pairs can be specialized to that setting.

Let τ be a period two automorphism of a simple Euclidean Jordan algebra E with complexification A. There are corresponding decompositions E = E_{+} ⊕ E_{−} and A = A_{+} ⊕ A_{−} into ±1 eigenspaces of τ. Let V ≡ A_{τ} = A_{−}. τ is assumed to satisfy the additional condition that the trace form on V defines an inner product. For a in V, define Q_{τ}(a) to be the restriction of Q(a) to V. For a pair (a,b) in V^{2}, define B_{τ}(a,b) and R_{τ}(a,b) to be the restriction of B(a,b) and R(a,b) to V. Then V is simple if and only if the only subspaces invariant under all the operators Q_{τ}(a) and R_{τ}(a,b) are (0) and V.

The conditions for quasi-invertibility in A show that B_{τ}(a,b) is invertible if and only if B(a,b) is invertible. The quasi-inverse a^{b} is the same whether computed in A or V. A space of equivalence classes X_{τ} can be defined on pairs V^{2}. It is a closed subspace of X, so compact. It also has the structure of a complex manifold, modelled on V. The structure group Γ(V) can be defined in terms of Q_{τ} and it has as a subgroup the unitary structure group Γ_{u}(V) = Γ(V) ∩ U(V) with identity component K_{τ}. The group K_{τ} is the identity component of the fixed point subgroup of τ in K. Let G_{τ} be the group of biholomorphisms of X_{τ} generated by W in G_{τ,0}, the identity component of Γ(V), and the Abelian groups G_{τ,−1} consisting of the S_{a} and G_{τ,+1} consisting of the T_{b} with a and b in V. It acts transitively on X_{τ} with stabilizer G_{τ,0}G_{τ,−1} and G_{τ} = G_{τ,0}G_{τ,−1}G_{τ,+1}G_{τ,−1}. The Lie algebra $\mathfrak{g}_\tau$ of holomorphic vector fields on X_{τ} is a 3-graded Lie algebra,

$$\displaystyle{\mathfrak{g}_\tau = \mathfrak{g}_{\tau,+1} \oplus \mathfrak{g}_{\tau,0} \oplus
\mathfrak{g}_{\tau,-1}.}$$

Restricted to V the components are generated as before by the constant functions into V, by the operators R_{τ}(a,b) and by the operators Q_{τ}(a). The Lie brackets are given by exactly the same formula as before.

The spectral decomposition in E_{τ} and V is accomplished using tripotents, i.e. elements e such that e^{3} = e. In this case f = e^{2} is an idempotent in E_{+}. There is a Pierce decomposition E = E_{0}(f) ⊕ E_{1/2}(f) ⊕ E_{1}(f) into eigenspaces of L(f). The operators L(e) and L(f) commute, so L(e) leaves the eigenspaces above invariant. In fact L(e)^{2} acts as 0 on E_{0}(f), as 1/4 on E_{1/2}(f) and 1 on E_{1}(f). This induces a Pierce decomposition E_{τ} = E_{τ,0}(f) ⊕ E_{τ,1/2}(f) ⊕ E_{τ,1}(f). The subspace E_{τ,1}(f) becomes a Euclidean Jordan algebra with unit f under the mutation Jordan product x ∘ y = {x,e,y}.

Two tripotents e_{1} and e_{2} are said to be orthogonal if all the operators [L(a),L(b)] = 0 when a and b are powers of e_{1} and e_{2} and if the corresponding idempotents f_{1} and f_{2} are orthogonal. In this case e_{1} and e_{2} generate a commutative associative algebra and e_{1}e_{2} = 0, since (e_{1}e_{2},e_{1}e_{2}) =(f_{1},f_{2}) =0. Let a be in E_{τ}. Let F be the finite-dimensional real subspace spanned by odd powers of a. The commuting self-adjoint operators L(x)L(y) with x, y odd powers of a act on F, so can be simultaneously diagonalized by an orthonormal basis e_{i}. Since (e_{i})^{3} is a positive multiple of e_{i}, rescaling if necessary, e_{i} can be chosen to be a tripotent. They form an orthogonal family by construction. Since a is in F, it can be written a = Σ α_{i} e_{i} with α_{i} real. These are called the eigenvalues of a (with respect to τ). Any other tripotent e in F has the form a = Σ ε_{i} e_{i} with ε_{i} = 0, ±1, so the e_{i} are up to sign the minimal tripotents in F.

A maximal family of orthogonal tripotents in E_{τ} is called a Jordan frame. The tripotents are necessarily minimal. All Jordan frames have the same number of elements, called the rank of E_{τ}. Any two frames are related by an element in the subgroup of the structure group of E_{τ} preserving the trace form. For a given Jordan frame (e_{i}), any element a in V can be written in the form a = u Σ α_{i} e_{i} with α_{i} ≥ 0 and u an operator in K_{τ}. The spectral norm of a is defined by ||a|| = sup α_{i} and is independent of choices. Its square equals the operator norm of Q_{τ}(a). Thus V becomes a complex normed space with open unit ball D_{τ}.

Note that for x in E, the operator Q(x) is self-adjoint so that the norm ||Q(x)^{n}|| = ||Q(x)||^{n}. Since Q(x)^{n} = Q(x^{n}), it follows that ||x^{n}|| = ||x||^{n}. In particular the spectral norm of x = Σ α_{i} e_{i} in A is the square root of the spectral norm of x^{2} = Σ (α_{i})^{2} f_{i}. It follows that the spectral norm of x is the same whether calculated in A or A_{τ}. Since K_{τ} preserves both norms, the spectral norm on A_{τ} is obtained by restricting the spectral norm on A.

For a Jordan frame e_{1}, ..., e_{m}, let V_{e} = ⊕ C e_{i}. There is an action of SL(2,C)^{m} on V_{e} which extends to V. If c = Σ γ_{i}e_{i} and b = Σ β_{i}e_{i}, then S(c) and T(b) give the action of the product of the lower and upper unitriangular matrices. If a = Σ α_{i}e_{i} with α_{i} ≠ 0, then the corresponding product of diagonal matrices act as W = B_{τ}(a, e − a), where e = Σ e_{i}. In particular the diagonal matrices give an action of (C*)^{m} and T^{m}.

As in the case without an automorphism τ, there is an automorphism θ of G_{τ}. The same arguments show that the fixed point subgroup H_{τ} is generated by K_{τ} and the image of SU(2)^{m}. It is a compact connected Lie group. It acts transitively on X_{τ}; the stabilizer of (0:0) is K_{τ}. Thus X_{τ} = H_{τ}/K_{τ}, a Hermitian symmetric space of compact type.

Let H_{τ}* be the identity component of the closed subgroup of G_{τ} carrying D_{τ} onto itself. It is generated by K_{τ} and the image of SU(1,1)^{m} corresponding to a Jordan frame. Let ρ be the conjugate-linear period 2 automorphism of $\mathfrak{g}_\tau$ defined by

$$\displaystyle{\rho(a,T,b)=(-a^*,-T^*,-b^*).}$$

Let $\mathfrak{h}^*_\tau$ be the fixed point algebra of ρ. It is the Lie algebra of H_{τ}*. It induces a period 2 automorphism of G with fixed point subgroup H_{τ}*. The group H_{τ}* acts transitively on D_{τ}. The stabilizer of 0 is K_{τ}*. H_{τ}*/K_{τ} is the Hermitian symmetric space of noncompact type dual to H_{τ}/K_{τ}.

The Hermitian symmetric space of non-compact type have an unbounded realization, analogous the upper half-plane in C. Möbius transformations in PSL(2,C) corresponding to the Cayley transform and its inverse give biholomorphisms of the Riemann sphere exchanging the unit disk and the upper halfplane. When the Hermitian symmetric space is of tube type the same Möbius transformations map the disk D in A onto the tube domain T = E + iC were C is the open self-dual convex cone of squares in the Euclidean Jordan algebra E.

For Hermitian symmetric space not of tube type there is no action of PSL(2,C) on X, so no analogous Cayley transform. A partial Cayley transform can be defined in that case for any given maximal tripotent e = Σ ε_{i} e_{i} in E_{τ}. It takes the disk D_{τ} in A_{τ} = A_{τ,1}(f) ⊕ A_{τ,1/2}(f) onto a Siegel domain of the second kind.

In this case E_{τ,1}(f) is a Euclidean Jordan algebra and there is symmetric E_{τ,1}(f)-valued bilinear form on E_{τ,1/2}(f) such that the corresponding quadratic form q takes values in its positive cone C_{τ}. The Siegel domain consists of pairs (x + iy,u + iv) such that y − q(u) − q(v) lies in C_{τ}. The quadratic form q on E_{τ,1/2}(f) and the squaring operation on E_{τ,1}(f) are given by x ↦ Q_{τ}(x)e. The positive cone C_{τ} corresponds to x with Q_{τ}(x) invertible.

== Examples ==
For simple Euclidean Jordan algebras E with complexication A, the Hermitian symmetric spaces of compact type X can be described explicitly as follows, using Cartan's classification.

Type I_{n}. A is the Jordan algebra of n × n complex matrices M_{n}(C) with the operator Jordan product x ∘ y = 1/2(xy + yx). It is the complexification of E = H_{n}(C), the Euclidean Jordan algebra of self-adjoint n × n complex matrices. In this case G = PSL(2n,C) acting on A with
$$g=\begin{pmatrix}a & b \\ c & d\end{pmatrix}$$
acting as g(z) = (az + b)(cz + d)^{−1}. Indeed, this can be verified directly for diagonal, upper and lower unitriangular matrices which correspond to the operators W, S_{c} and T_{b}. The subset Ω corresponds to the matrices g with d invertible. In fact consider the space of linear maps from C^{n} to C^{2n} = C^{n} ⊕ C^{n}. It is described by a pair (T_{1}|T_{2}) with T_{i} in M_{n}(C). This is a module for GL(2n,C) acting on the target space. There is also an action of GL(n,C) induced by the action on the source space. The space of injective maps U is invariant and GL(n,C) acts freely on it. The quotient is the Grassmannian M consisting of n-dimensional subspaces of C^{2n}. Define a map of A^{2} into M by sending (a,b) to the injective map (a|I − b^{t}a). This map induces an isomorphism of X onto M.

In fact let V be an n-dimensional subspace of C^{n} ⊕ C^{n}. If it is in general position, i.e. it and its orthogonal complement have trivial intersection with C^{n} ⊕ (0) and (0) ⊕ C^{n}, it is the graph of an invertible operator T. So the image corresponds to (a|I − b^{t}a) with a = I and b^{t} = I − T.

At the other extreme, V and its orthogonal complement U can be written as orthogonal sums V = V_{1} ⊕ V_{2}, U = U_{1} ⊕ U_{2}, where V_{1} and U_{1} are the intersections with C^{n} ⊕ (0) and V_{2} and U_{2} with (0) ⊕ C^{n}. Then dim V_{1} = dim U_{2} and dim V_{2} = dim U_{1}. Moreover, C^{n} ⊕ (0) = V_{1} ⊕ U_{1} and (0) ⊕ C^{n} = V_{2} ⊕ U_{2}. The subspace V corresponds to the pair (e|I − e), where e is the orthogonal projection of C^{n} ⊕ (0) onto V_{1}. So a = e and b = I.

The general case is a direct sum of these two cases. V can be written as an orthogonal sum V = V_{0} ⊕ V_{1} ⊕ V_{2} where V_{1} and V_{2} are the intersections with C^{n} ⊕ (0) and (0) ⊕ C^{n} and V_{0} is their orthogonal complement in V. Similarly the orthogonal complement U of V can be written U = U_{0} ⊕ U_{1} ⊕ U_{2}. Thus C^{n} ⊕ (0) = V_{1} ⊕ U_{1} ⊕ W_{1} and (0) ⊕ C^{n} = V_{2} ⊕ U_{2} ⊕ W_{2}, where W_{i} are orthogonal complements. The direct sum (V_{1} ⊕ U_{1}) ⊕ (V_{2} ⊕ U_{2}) ⊆ C^{n} ⊕ C^{n} is of the second kind and its orthogonal complement of the first.

Maps W in the structure group correspond to h in GL(n,C), with W(a) = hah^{t}. The corresponding map on M sends (x|y) to (hx|(h^{t})^{−1}y). Similarly the map corresponding to S_{c} sends (x|y) to (x|y + c), the map corresponding to T_{b} sends (x|y) to (x + b|y) and the map corresponding to J sends (x|y) to (y|−x). It follows that the map corresponding to g sends (x|y) to (ax + by|cx + dy). On the other hand, if y is invertible, (x|y) is equivalent to (xy^{−1}|I), whence the formula for the fractional linear transformation.

Type III_{n}. A is the Jordan algebra of n × n symmetric complex matrices S_{n}(C) with the operator Jordan product x ∘ y = 1/2(xy + yx). It is the complexification of E = H_{n}(R), the Euclidean Jordan algebra of n × n symmetric real matrices. On C^{2n} = C^{n} ⊕ C^{n}, define a nondegenerate alternating bilinear form by ω(x_{1} ⊕ y_{1}, x_{2} ⊕ y_{2}) = x_{1} • y_{2} − y_{1} • x_{2}. In matrix notation if
$$J=\begin{pmatrix} 0 & I \\ -I & 0\end{pmatrix}$$,

$$\displaystyle{\omega(z_1,z_2)=zJz^t.}$$

Let Sp(2n,C) denote the complex symplectic group, the subgroup of GL(2n,C) preserving ω. It consists of g such that gJg^{t} = J and is closed under g ↦ g^{t}. If
$$g=\begin{pmatrix}a & b \\ c & d\end{pmatrix}$$
belongs to Sp(2n,C) then

$$\displaystyle{g^{-1}=\begin{pmatrix}d^t & -c^t \\ -b^t & a^t\end{pmatrix}.}$$

It has center {±I}. In this case G = Sp(2n,C)/{±I} acting on A as g(z) = (az + b)(cz + d)^{−1}. Indeed, this can be verified directly for diagonal, upper and lower unitriangular matrices which correspond to the operators W, S_{c} and T_{b}. The subset Ω corresponds to the matrices g with d invertible. In fact consider the space of linear maps from C^{n} to C^{2n} = C^{n} ⊕ C^{n}. It is described by a pair (T_{1}|T_{2}) with T_{i} in M_{n}(C). This is a module for Sp(2n,C) acting on the target space. There is also an action of GL(n,C) induced by the action on the source space. The space of injective maps U with isotropic image, i.e. ω vanishes on the image, is invariant. Moreover, GL(n,C) acts freely on it. The quotient is the symplectic Grassmannian M consisting of n-dimensional Lagrangian subspaces of C^{2n}. Define a map of A^{2} into M by sending (a,b) to the injective map (a|I − ba). This map induces an isomorphism of X onto M.

In fact let V be an n-dimensional Lagrangian subspace of C^{n} ⊕ C^{n}. Let U be a Lagrangian subspace complementing V. If they are in general position, i.e. they have trivial intersection with C^{n} ⊕ (0) and (0) ⊕ C^{n}, than V is the graph of an invertible operator T with T^{t} = T. So the image corresponds to (a|I − ba) with a = I and b = I − T.

At the other extreme, V and U can be written as direct sums V = V_{1} ⊕ V_{2}, U = U_{1} ⊕ U_{2}, where V_{1} and U_{1} are the intersections with C^{n} ⊕ (0) and V_{2} and U_{2} with (0) ⊕ C^{n}. Then dim V_{1} = dim U_{2} and dim V_{2} = dim U_{1}. Moreover, C^{n} ⊕ (0) = V_{1} ⊕ U_{1} and (0) ⊕ C^{n} = V_{2} ⊕ U_{2}. The subspace V corresponds to the pair (e|I − e), where e is the projection of C^{n} ⊕ (0) onto V_{1}. Note that the pair (C^{n} ⊕ (0), (0) ⊕ C^{n}) is in duality with respect to ω and the identification between them induces the canonical symmetric bilinear form on C^{n}. In particular V_{1} is identified with U_{2} and V_{2} with U_{1}. Moreover, they are V_{1} and U_{1} are orthogonal with respect to the symmetric bilinear form on (C^{n} ⊕ (0). Hence the idempotent e satisfies e^{t} = e. So a = e and b = I lie in A and V is the image of (a|I − ba).

The general case is a direct sum of these two cases. V can be written as a direct sum V = V_{0} ⊕ V_{1} ⊕ V_{2} where V_{1} and V_{2} are the intersections with C^{n} ⊕ (0) and (0) ⊕ C^{n} and V_{0} is a complement in V. Similarly U can be written U = U_{0} ⊕ U_{1} ⊕ U_{2}. Thus C^{n} ⊕ (0) = V_{1} ⊕ U_{1} ⊕ W_{1} and (0) ⊕ C^{n} = V_{2} ⊕ U_{2} ⊕ W_{2}, where W_{i} are complements. The direct sum (V_{1} ⊕ U_{1}) ⊕ (V_{2} ⊕ U_{2}) ⊆ C^{n} ⊕ C^{n} is of the second kind. It has a complement of the first kind.

Maps W in the structure group correspond to h in GL(n,C), with W(a) = hah^{t}. The corresponding map on M sends (x|y) to (hx|(h^{t})^{−1}y). Similarly the map corresponding to S_{c} sends (x|y) to (x|y + c), the map corresponding to T_{b} sends (x|y) to (x + b|y) and the map corresponding to J sends (x|y) to (y|−x). It follows that the map corresponding to g sends (x|y) to (ax + by|cx + dy). On the other hand, if y is invertible, (x|y) is equivalent to (xy^{−1}|I), whence the formula for the fractional linear transformation.

Type II_{2n}. A is the Jordan algebra of 2n × 2n skew-symmetric complex matrices A_{n}(C) and Jordan product x ∘ y = −1/2(x J y + y J x) where the unit is given by
$$J=\begin{pmatrix}0 & I \\ -I & 0\end{pmatrix}$$
. It is the complexification of E = H_{n}(H), the Euclidean Jordan algebra of self-adjoint n × n matrices with entries in the quaternions. This is discussed in Loos (1977) and Koecher (1969).

Type IV_{n}. A is the Jordan algebra C^{n} ⊕ C with Jordan product (x,α) ∘ (y,β) = (βx + αy,αβ + x•y). It is the complexication of the rank 2 Euclidean Jordan algebra defined by the same formulas but with real coefficients. This is discussed in Loos (1977).

Type VI. The complexified Albert algebra. This is discussed in Faulkner (1972), Loos (1978) and Drucker (1981).

The Hermitian symmetric spaces of compact type X for simple Euclidean Jordan algebras E with period two automorphism can be described explicitly as follows, using Cartan's classification.

Type I_{p,q}. Let F be the space of q by p matrices over R with p ≠ q. This corresponds to the automorphism of E = H_{p + q}(R) given by conjugating by the diagonal matrix with p diagonal entries equal to 1 and q to −1. Without loss of generality p can be taken greater than q. The structure is given by the triple product xy^{t}z. The space X can be identified with the Grassmannian of p-dimensional subspace of C^{p + q} = C^{p} ⊕ C^{q}. This has a natural embedding in C^{2p} = C^{p} ⊕ C^{p} by adding 0's in the last p − q coordinates. Since any p-dimensional subspace of C^{2p} can be represented in the form [I − y^{t}x|x], the same is true for subspaces lying in C^{p + q}. The last p − q rows of x must vanish and the mapping does not change if the last p − q rows of y are set equal to zero. So a similar representation holds for mappings, but now with q by p matrices. Exactly as when p = q, it follows that there is an action of GL(p + q, C) by fractional linear transformations.

Type II_{n} F is the space of real skew-symmetric m by m matrices. After removing a factor of √-1, this corresponds to the period 2 automorphism given by complex conjugation on E = H_{n}(C).

Type V. F is the direct sum of two copies of the Cayley numbers, regarded as 1 by 2 matrices. This corresponds to the canonical period 2 automorphism defined by any minimal idempotent in E = H_{3}(O).

== See also ==
- Mutation (algebra)
- Symmetric cone
