= Valya algebra =

In abstract algebra, a Valya algebra (or Valentina algebra) is a nonassociative algebra M over a field F whose multiplicative binary operation g satisfies the following axioms:

1. The skew-symmetry condition

$$g (A, B) =-g (B, A)$$

for all $A,B \in M$.

2. The Valya identity

$$J (g (A_1, A_2), g (A_3, A_4), g (A_5, A_6)) =0$$

for all $A_k \in M$, where k=1,2,...,6, and

$J (A, B, C):= g (g (A, B), C)+g (g (B, C), A)+g (g (C, A), B).$

3. The bilinear condition

$$g(aA+bB,C)=ag(A,C)+bg(B,C)$$

for all $A,B,C \in M$ and $a,b \in F$.

We say that M is a Valya algebra if the commutant of this algebra is a Lie subalgebra. Each Lie algebra is a Valya algebra.

There is the following relationship between the commutant-associative algebra and Valentina algebra. The replacement of the multiplication g(A,B) in an algebra M by the operation of commutation [A,B]=g(A,B)-g(B,A), makes it into the algebra $M^{(-)}$. If M is a commutant-associative algebra, then $M^{(-)}$ is a Valya algebra. A Valya algebra is a generalization of a Lie algebra.

== Examples ==
Let us give the following examples regarding Valya algebras.

(1) Every finite Valya algebra is the tangent algebra of an analytic local commutant-associative loop (Valya loop) as each finite Lie algebra is the tangent algebra of an analytic local group (Lie group). This is the analog of the classical correspondence between analytic local groups (Lie groups) and Lie algebras.

(2) A bilinear operation for the differential 1-forms

$$\alpha=F_k(x)\, dx^k , \quad \beta=G_k(x)\, dx^k$$

on a symplectic manifold can be introduced by the rule

$$(\alpha,\beta)_0=d \Psi(\alpha,\beta)+ \Psi(d\alpha,\beta)+\Psi(\alpha,d\beta), \,$$

where $(\alpha,\beta)$ is 1-form. A set of all nonclosed 1-forms, together with this operation, is Lie algebra.

If $\alpha$ and $\beta$ are closed 1-forms, then $d\alpha=d\beta=0$ and

$$(\alpha,\beta)=d \Psi(\alpha,\beta). \,$$

A set of all closed 1-forms, together with this bracket, form a Lie algebra. A set of all nonclosed 1-forms together with the bilinear operation $(\alpha,\beta)$ is a Valya algebra, and it is not a Lie algebra.

== See also ==
- Malcev algebra
- Alternative algebra
- Commutant-associative algebra
