= Kevin McCrimmon =

American mathematician

Kevin Mor McCrimmon (born September 1941) is an American mathematician, specializing in Jordan algebras. He is known for his introduction of quadratic Jordan algebras in 1966.

McCrimmon attended secondary school in Champaign-Urbana, Illinois and then received his bachelor's degree in mathematics in 1960 from Reed College in Portland, Oregon. He received his Ph.D. from Yale University in 1965 with thesis Norms and Noncommutative Jordan Algebras supervised by Nathan Jacobson. McCrimmon spent his final year as a graduate student at the University of Chicago, when Nathan Jacobson spent a year of unpaid leave visiting Chicago and Japan for the academic year 1964–1965. As a postdoc, McCrimmon was at Massachusetts Institute of Technology from 1965 to 1967, for one year as an Air Force Research Laboratory Postdoctoral Fellow and for the next year as a C. L. E. Moore instructor. He became in 1967 a member of the Center for Advanced Studies at the University of Virginia (UVA), in 1968 an associate professor at UVA, and in 1972, a full professor at UVA, retiring there as professor emeritus. He was chair of the mathematics department from 1972 to 1975.

McCrimmon was a Sloan Fellow in 1968 and an Invited Speaker of the International Congress of Mathematicians in 1974 in Vancouver. He spent several years on sabbatical in Europe. He was elected a Fellow of the American Mathematical Society in 2017.

== Selected publications ==
- McCrimmon, K.; Schafer, R. D. (1966). "On a class of noncommutative Jordan algebras". Proceedings of the National Academy of Sciences of the United States of America. 56 (1): 1–4. Bibcode:1966PNAS...56....1M. doi:10.1073/pnas.56.1.1. PMC 285663. PMID 5338591.
- McCrimmon, Kevin (1966). "A general theory of Jordan rings". Proceedings of the National Academy of Sciences of the United States of America. 56 (4): 1072–1079. Bibcode:1966PNAS...56.1072M. doi:10.1073/pnas.56.4.1072. PMC 220000. PMID 16591377.
- McCrimmon, Kevin (1969). "The radical of a Jordan algebra". Proceedings of the National Academy of Sciences of the United States of America. 62 (3): 671–678. Bibcode:1969PNAS...62..671M. doi:10.1073/pnas.62.3.671. PMC 223650. PMID 16591736.
- McCrimmon, Kevin (1969). "The Freudenthal-Springer-Tits constructions of exceptional Jordan algebras". Transactions of the American Mathematical Society. 139: 495–510. doi:10.2307/1995337. JSTOR 1995337.
- McCrimmon, Kevin (1969). "On Herstein's theorems relating Jordan and associative algebras". Journal of Algebra. 13 (3): 382–392. doi:10.1016/0021-8693(69)90081-7.
- McCrimmon, Kevin (1971). "Noncommutative Jordan rings". Transactions of the American Mathematical Society. 158: 1–33. doi:10.1090/S0002-9947-1971-0310024-7.
- McCrimmon, Kevin (1971). "Inner ideals in quadratic Jordan algebras". Transactions of the American Mathematical Society. 159: 445–468. doi:10.1090/S0002-9947-1971-0279145-1.
- McCrimmon, Kevin (1978). "Jordan algebras and their applications". Bulletin of the American Mathematical Society. 84 (4): 612–627. doi:10.1090/S0002-9904-1978-14503-0.
- Hogben, Leslie; McCrimmon, Kevin (1981). "Maximal modular inner ideals and the Jacobson radical of a Jordan algebra". Journal of Algebra. 68 (1): 155–169. doi:10.1016/0021-8693(81)90291-X.
- McCrimmon, Kevin; Zelmanov, Efim (1988). "The structure of strongly prime quadratic Jordan algebras". Advances in Mathematics. 69 (2): 133–222. doi:10.1016/0001-8708(88)90001-1.
- A taste of Jordan algebras. Universitext. Springer Science & Business Media. 2006. doi:10.1007/b97489. ISBN 0-387-95447-3.
