= Commutant-associative algebra =

In abstract algebra, a commutant-associative algebra is a nonassociative algebra over a field whose multiplication satisfies the following axiom:

$$([A_1,A_2], [A_3,A_4], [A_5,A_6]) =0$$,

where [A, B] = AB − BA is the commutator of A and B and (A, B, C) = (AB)C – A(BC) is the associator of A, B and C.

In other words, an algebra M is commutant-associative if the commutant, i.e. the subalgebra of M generated by all commutators [A, B], is an associative algebra.

== See also ==
- Valya algebra
- Malcev algebra
- Alternative algebra
