= Wedderburn's theorem =

Wedderburn's theorem may refer to:

- Artin–Wedderburn theorem, classifying semisimple rings and semisimple algebras
- Wedderburn's theorem on simple rings with a unit and a minimal left ideal
- Wedderburn's little theorem, that a finite domain is a commutative field
- The Wedderburn principal theorem
