= Freudenthal algebra =

In algebra, Freudenthal algebras are certain Jordan algebras constructed from composition algebras.

== Definition ==
Suppose that C is a composition algebra over a field F and a is a diagonal matrix in GL_{n}(F). A reduced Freudenthal algebra is defined to be a Jordan algebra equal to the set of 3 by 3 matrices X over C such that X̅^{T}a=aX. A Freudenthal algebra is any twisted form of a reduced Freudental algebra.
