= Artin–Zorn theorem =

Mathematical result

In mathematics, the Artin–Zorn theorem, named after Emil Artin and Max Zorn, states that any finite alternative division ring is necessarily a finite field. It was first published in 1930 by Zorn, but in his publication Zorn credited it to Artin.

The Artin–Zorn theorem is a generalization of Wedderburn's little theorem, which states that finite associative division rings are fields. As a geometric consequence, every finite Moufang plane is the classical projective plane over a finite field.
