= Peirce decomposition =

Decomposition method in algebra

In ring theory, a branch of mathematics, a Peirce decomposition /ˈpɜːrs/ is a decomposition of an algebra as a sum of eigenspaces of commuting idempotent elements. The Peirce decomposition for associative algebras was introduced by Benjamin Peirce (1870, proposition 41, page 13). A Peirce decomposition for Jordan algebras (which are non-associative) was introduced by Albert (1947).

== Peirce decomposition for associative algebras ==
If e is an idempotent element (e^{2} = e) of an associative algebra A, the two-sided Peirce decomposition of A given the single idempotent e is the direct sum of eAe, eA(1 − e), (1 − e)Ae, and (1 − e)A(1 − e). There are also corresponding left and right Peirce decompositions. The left Peirce decomposition of A is the direct sum of eA and (1 − e)A and the right decomposition of A is the direct sum of Ae and A(1 − e).

In those simple cases, 1 − e is also idempotent and is orthogonal to e (that is, e(1 − e) = (1 − e)e = 0), and the sum of 1 − e and e is 1. In general, given idempotent elements e_{1}, ..., e_{n} which are mutually orthogonal and sum to 1, then a two-sided Peirce decomposition of A with respect to e_{1}, ..., e_{n} is the direct sum of the spaces e_{i} Ae_{j} for 1 ≤ i, j ≤ n. The left decomposition is the direct sum of e_{i} A for 1 ≤ i ≤ n and the right decomposition is the direct sum of Ae_{i} for 1 ≤ i ≤ n.

Generally, given a set e_{1}, ..., e_{m} of mutually orthogonal idempotents of A which sum to e_{sum} rather than to 1, then the element 1 − e_{sum} will be idempotent and orthogonal to all of e_{1}, ..., e_{m}, and the set e_{1}, ..., e_{m}, 1 − e_{sum} will have the property that it now sums to 1, and so relabeling the new set of elements such that n = m + 1, e_{n} = 1 − e_{sum} makes it a suitable set for two-sided, right, and left Peirce decompositions of A using the definitions in the last paragraph. This is the generalization of the simple single-idempotent case in the first paragraph of this section.

== Blocks ==
An idempotent of a ring is called central if it commutes with all elements of the ring.

Two idempotents e, f are called orthogonal if ef = fe = 0.

An idempotent is called primitive if it is nonzero and cannot be written as the sum of two nonzero orthogonal idempotents.

An idempotent e is called a block or centrally primitive if it is nonzero and central and cannot be written as the sum of two orthogonal nonzero central idempotents. In this case the ideal eR is also sometimes called a block.

If the identity 1 of a ring R can be written as the sum

1 = e_{1} + ... + e_{n}

of orthogonal nonzero centrally primitive idempotents, then these idempotents are unique up to order and are called the blocks or the ring R. In this case the ring R can be written as a direct sum

R = e_{1}R + ... + e_{n}R

of indecomposable rings, which are sometimes also called the blocks of R.
