= Triple system =

In algebra, a triple system (or ternar) is a vector space V over a field F together with a F-trilinear map

$$(\cdot,\cdot,\cdot) \colon V\times V \times V\to V.$$

The most important examples are Lie triple systems and Jordan triple systems. They were introduced by Nathan Jacobson in 1949. In particular, any Lie algebra defines a Lie triple system and any Jordan algebra defines a Jordan triple system. They are important in the theories of symmetric spaces, particularly Hermitian symmetric spaces and their generalizations (symmetric R-spaces and their noncompact duals).

== Lie triple systems ==
A triple system is said to be a Lie triple system if the trilinear map, denoted $[\cdot,\cdot,\cdot]$, satisfies the following identities:

$$[u,v,w] = -[v,u,w]$$
$$[u,v,w] + [w,u,v] + [v,w,u] = 0$$
$$[u,v,[w,x,y]] = [[u,v,w],x,y] + [w,[u,v,x],y] + [w,x,[u,v,y]].$$

The first two identities abstract the skew symmetry and Jacobi identity for the triple commutator, while the third identity means that the linear map L_{u,v}: V → V, defined by L_{u,v}(w) = [u, v, w], is a derivation of the triple product. The identity also shows that the space of linear operators $\mathfrak{h}$ = span {L_{u,v} : u, v ∈ V} is closed under commutator bracket, hence a Lie algebra.

It follows that

$$\mathfrak{g} := \mathfrak{h} \oplus V$$

is a $\mathbb{Z}_2$-graded Lie algebra with $\mathfrak{h}$ of grade 0 and V of grade 1, and bracket

$$[(L,u),(M,v)] = ([L,M]+L_{u,v}, L(v) - M(u)).$$

This is called the standard embedding of the Lie triple system V into a $\mathbb{Z}_2$-graded Lie algebra. Conversely, given any $\mathbb{Z}_2$-graded Lie algebra, the triple bracket [[u, v], w] makes the space of degree-1 elements into a Lie triple system.

However, these methods of converting a Lie triple system into a $\mathbb{Z}_2$-graded Lie algebra and vice versa are not inverses: more precisely, they do not define an equivalence of categories. For example, if we start with any abelian $\mathbb{Z}_2$-graded Lie algebra, the round trip process produces one where the grade-0 space is zero-dimensional, since we obtain $\mathfrak{h}$ = span {L_{u,v} : u, v ∈ V} = {0}.

Given any Lie triple system V, and letting $\mathfrak{g} = \mathfrak{h} \oplus V$ be the corresponding $\mathbb{Z}_2$-graded Lie algebra, this decomposition of $\mathfrak{g}$ obeys the algebraic definition of a symmetric space, so if G is any connected Lie group with Lie algebra $\mathfrak{g}$ and H is a subgroup with Lie algebra $\mathfrak{h}$, then G/H is a symmetric space. Conversely, the tangent space of any point in any symmetric space is naturally a Lie triple system.

We can also obtain Lie triple systems from any Lie algebra by setting

$$[a,b,c] = [[a,b],c].$$

== Jordan triple systems ==
A triple system V is said to be a Jordan triple system if the trilinear map, denoted $\{\cdot,\cdot,\cdot\}$, satisfies the following identities:

$$\{u,v,w\} = \{u,w,v\}$$
$$\{u,v,\{w,x,y\}\} = \{w,x,\{u,v,y\}\} + \{w, \{u,v,x\},y\} -\{\{v,u,w\},x,y\}.$$

The second identity means that if L_{u,v}:V→V is defined by L_{u,v}(y) = {u, v, y} then

$$[L_{u,v},L_{w,x}]:= L_{u,v}\circ L_{w,x} - L_{w,x} \circ L_{u,v} = L_{w,\{u,v,x\}}-L_{\{v,u,w\},x}$$

so that the space of linear maps span {L_{u,v}:u,v ∈ V} is closed under commutator bracket, and hence is a Lie algebra $\mathfrak{g}_0$.

A Jordan triple system is said to be positive definite (resp. nondegenerate) if the bilinear form on V defined by the trace of L_{u,v} is positive definite (resp. nondegenerate). In either case, there is an identification of V with its dual space, and a corresponding involution on $\mathfrak{g}_0$. They induce an involution of

$$V\oplus\mathfrak g_0\oplus V^*$$

which in the positive definite case is a Cartan involution. The corresponding symmetric space is a symmetric R-space. It has a noncompact dual given by replacing the Cartan involution by its composite with the involution equal to +1 on $\mathfrak{g}_0$ and −1 on V and V^{*}. A special case of this construction arises when $\mathfrak{g}_0$ preserves a complex structure on V. In this case we obtain dual Hermitian symmetric spaces of compact and noncompact type (the latter being bounded symmetric domains).

Any Jordan triple system is a Lie triple system with respect to the operation

$$[u,v,w] = \{u,v,w\} - \{v,u,w\}.$$

== Jordan pairs ==
A Jordan pair is a generalization of a Jordan triple system involving two vector spaces V_{+} and V_{−}. The trilinear map is then replaced by a pair of trilinear maps

$$\{\cdot,\cdot,\cdot\}_+\colon V_-\times S^2V_+ \to V_+$$
$$\{\cdot,\cdot,\cdot\}_-\colon V_+\times S^2V_- \to V_-$$.

The other Jordan axiom (apart from symmetry) is likewise replaced by two axioms, one being

$$\{u,v,\{w,x,y\}_+\}_+ = \{w,x,\{u,v,y\}_+\}_+ + \{w, \{u,v,x\}_+,y\}_+ - \{\{v,u,w\}_-,x,y\}_+$$

and the other being the analogue with + and − subscripts exchanged. The trilinear maps are often viewed as quadratic maps

$$Q_+ \colon V_+ \to \text{Hom}(V_-, V_+)$$
$$Q_- \colon V_- \to \text{Hom}(V_+, V_-) .$$

As in the case of Jordan triple systems, one can define, for u in V_{−} and v in V_{+}, a linear map

$$L^+_{u,v}:V_+\to V_+ \quad\text{by} \quad L^+_{u,v}(y) = \{u,v,y\}_+$$

and similarly L^{−}. The Jordan axioms (apart from symmetry) may then be written

$$[L^{\pm}_{u,v},L^{\pm}_{w,x}] = L^{\pm}_{w,\{u,v,x\}_\pm}-L^{\pm}_{\{v,u,w\}_{\mp},x}$$

which imply that the images of L^{+} and L^{−} are closed under commutator brackets in End(V_{+}) and End(V_{−}). Together they determine a linear map

$$V_+\otimes V_- \to \mathfrak{gl}(V_+)\oplus \mathfrak{gl}(V_-)$$

whose image is a Lie subalgebra $\mathfrak{g}_0$, and the Jordan identities become Jacobi identities for a graded Lie bracket on

$$\mathfrak{g} := V_+\oplus \mathfrak g_0\oplus V_-,$$

making this space into a $\mathbb{Z}$-graded Lie algebra $\mathfrak{g}$ with only grades 1, 0, and -1 being nontrivial, often called a 3-graded Lie algebra. Conversely, given any 3-graded Lie algebra

$$\mathfrak g = \mathfrak g_{+1} \oplus \mathfrak g_0\oplus \mathfrak g_{-1},$$

then the pair $(\mathfrak g_{+1}, \mathfrak g_{-1})$ is a Jordan pair, with brackets

$$\{X_{\mp},Y_{\pm},Z_{\pm}\}_{\pm} := [[X_{\mp},Y_{\pm}],Z_{\pm}].$$

Jordan triple systems are Jordan pairs with V_{+} = V_{−} and equal trilinear maps. Another important case occurs when V_{+} and V_{−} are dual to one another, with dual trilinear maps determined by an element of

$$\mathrm{End}(S^2V_+) \cong S^2V_+^* \otimes S^2V_-^*\cong \mathrm{End}(S^2V_-).$$

These arise in particular when $\mathfrak g$ above is semisimple, when the Killing form provides a duality between $\mathfrak g_{+1}$ and $\mathfrak g_{-1}$.

For a simple example of a Jordan pair, let $V_+$ be a finite-dimensional vector space and $V_-$ the dual of that vector space, with the quadratic maps

$$Q_+ \colon V_+ \to \text{Hom}(V_-, V_+)$$
$$Q_- \colon V_- \to \text{Hom}(V_+, V_-)$$

given by

$$Q_+(v)(f) = f(v) \,v$$
$$Q_-(f)(v) = f(v) \, f$$

where $v \in V_+, f \in V_-$.

== See also ==
- Associator
- E_{7} (mathematics)
- Quadratic Jordan algebra
