= Moufang plane =

Type of projective plane

In geometry, a Moufang plane, named for Ruth Moufang, is a type of projective plane, more specifically a special type of translation plane. A translation plane is a projective plane that has a translation line, that is, a line with the property that the group of automorphisms that fixes every point of the line acts transitively on the points of the plane not on the line. A translation plane is Moufang if every line of the plane is a translation line.

== Characterizations ==
A Moufang plane can also be described as a projective plane in which the little Desargues theorem holds. This theorem states that a restricted form of Desargues' theorem holds for every line in the plane. For example, every Desarguesian plane is a Moufang plane.

In algebraic terms, a projective plane over any alternative division ring is a Moufang plane, and this gives a 1:1 correspondence between isomorphism classes of alternative division rings and of Moufang planes.

As a consequence of the algebraic Artin–Zorn theorem, that every finite alternative division ring is a field, every finite Moufang plane is Desarguesian, but some infinite Moufang planes are non-Desarguesian planes. In particular, the Cayley plane, an infinite Moufang projective plane over the octonions, is one of these because the octonions do not form a division ring.

== Properties ==
The following conditions on a projective plane P are equivalent:

- P is a Moufang plane.
- The group of automorphisms fixing all points of any given line acts transitively on the points not on the line.
- Some ternary ring of the plane is an alternative division ring.
- P is isomorphic to the projective plane over an alternative division ring.

Also, in a Moufang plane:

- The group of automorphisms acts transitively on quadrangles.
- Any two ternary rings of the plane are isomorphic.

== See also ==
- Moufang loop
- Moufang polygon
