= Ruth Moufang =

German mathematician

- Born: 10 January 1905; Darmstadt, Germany
- Died: 26 November 1977 (aged 72); Frankfurt am Main, Germany
- Education: Goethe University Frankfurt
- Known for: Moufang loop; Moufang plane; Moufang polygon; Moufang–Lie algebra; Moufang set
- Scientific career
- Fields: Mathematics
- Workplaces: Goethe University Frankfurt
- Doctoral advisor: Max Dehn

Ruth Moufang (10 January 1905 – 26 November 1977) was a German mathematician.

== Biography ==
She was born to German chemist Eduard Moufang and Else Fecht Moufang. Eduard Moufang was the son of Friedrich Carl Moufang (1848–1885) from Mainz, and Elisabeth von Moers from Mainz. Ruth Moufang's mother was Else Fecht, who was the daughter of Alexander Fecht (1848–1913) from Kehl and Ella Scholtz (1847–1921). Ruth was the younger of her parents' two daughters, having an elder sister named Erica.

== Education and career ==
She studied mathematics at the University of Frankfurt. In 1931 she received her Ph.D. on projective geometry under the direction of Max Dehn, and in 1932 spent a fellowship year in Rome. After her year in Rome, she returned to Germany to lecture at the University of Königsberg and the University of Frankfurt.

Denied permission to teach by the minister of education of Nazi Germany, she worked at Research and Development of Krupp (battleships, U-boats, tanks, howitzers, guns, etc.), where she became the first German woman with a doctorate to be employed as an industrial mathematician. At the end of World War II she was leading the Department of Applied Mathematics at the arms industry of Krupp.

In 1946 she was finally allowed to accept a teaching position at the University of Frankfurt, and in 1957 she became the first woman professor at the university.

== Research ==
Moufang's research in projective geometry built upon the work of David Hilbert. She was responsible for ground-breaking work on non-associative algebraic structures, including the Moufang loops named after her.

In 1933, Moufang showed Desargues's theorem does not hold in the Cayley plane. The Cayley plane uses octonion coordinates which do not satisfy the associative law. Such connections between geometry and algebra had been previously noted by Karl von Staudt and David Hilbert. Ruth Moufang thus initiated a new branch of geometry called Moufang planes.

She published 7 papers on this topic, these are

- Zur Struktur der projectiven Geometrie der Ebene (1931);
- Die Einführung in der ebenen Geometrie mit Hilfe des Satzes vom vollständigen Vierseit (1931);
- Die Schnittpunktssätze des projektiven speziellen Fünfecksnetzes in ihrer Abhängigkeit voneinander (1932);
- Ein Satz über die Schnittpunktsätze des allgemeinen Fünfecksnetzes (1932);
- Die Desarguesschen Sätze von Rang 10 (1933);
- Alternativkörper und der Satz vom vollständigen Vierseit (D_{9}) (1934); and
- Zur Struktur von Alternativkörpern (1934).

Moufang published only one paper on group theory, Einige Untersuchungen über geordnete Schiefkörper, which appeared in print in 1937.

== General references ==
- Ruth Moufang at the Mathematics Genealogy Project
- Srinivasan, Bhama (1984). "Ruth Moufang, 1905–1977". The Mathematical Intelligencer. 6 (2): 51–55. doi:10.1007/BF03024157.
