= Quadratic Jordan algebra =

In mathematics, quadratic Jordan algebras are a generalization of Jordan algebras introduced by Kevin McCrimmon (1966). The fundamental identities of the quadratic representation of a linear Jordan algebra are used as axioms to define a quadratic Jordan algebra over a field of arbitrary characteristic. There is a uniform description of finite-dimensional simple quadratic Jordan algebras, independent of characteristic. If 2 is invertible in the field of coefficients, the theory of quadratic Jordan algebras reduces to that of linear Jordan algebras.

== Definition ==
A quadratic Jordan algebra consists of a vector space A over a field K with a distinguished element 1 and a quadratic map of A into the K-endomorphisms of A, a ↦ Q(a), satisfying the conditions:

- Q(1) = id;
- Q(Q(a)b) = Q(a)Q(b)Q(a) ("fundamental identity");
- Q(a)R(b,a) = R(a,b)Q(a) ("commutation identity"), where R(a,b)c = (Q(a + c) − Q(a) − Q(c))b.

Further, these properties are required to hold under any extension of scalars.

=== Elements ===
An element a is invertible if Q(a) is invertible and there exists b such that Q(b) is the inverse of Q(a) and Q(a)b = a: such b is unique and we say that b is the inverse of a. A Jordan division algebra is one in which every non-zero element is invertible.

=== Structure ===
Let B be a subspace of A. Define B to be a quadratic ideal or an inner ideal if the image of Q(b) is contained in B for all b in B; define B to be an outer ideal if B is mapped into itself by every Q(a) for all a in A. An ideal of A is a subspace which is both an inner and an outer ideal. A quadratic Jordan algebra is simple if it contains no non-trivial ideals.

For given b, the image of Q(b) is an inner ideal: we call this the principal inner ideal on b.

The centroid Γ of A is the subset of End_{K}(A) consisting of endomorphisms T which "commute" with Q in the sense that for all a

- T Q(a) = Q(a) T;
- Q(Ta) = Q(a) T^{2}.

The centroid of a simple algebra is a field: A is central if its centroid is just K.

=== Examples ===
==== Quadratic Jordan algebra from an associative algebra ====
If A is a unital associative algebra over K with multiplication × then a quadratic map Q can be defined from A to End_{K}(A) by Q(a) : b ↦ a × b × a. This defines a quadratic Jordan algebra structure on A. A quadratic Jordan algebra is special if it is isomorphic to a subalgebra of such an algebra, otherwise exceptional.

==== Quadratic Jordan algebra from a quadratic form ====
Let A be a vector space over K with a quadratic form q and associated symmetric bilinear form q(x,y) = q(x+y) - q(x) - q(y). Let e be a "basepoint" of A, that is, an element with q(e) = 1. Define a linear functional T(y) = q(y,e) and a "reflection" y^{∗} = T(y)e - y. For each x we define Q(x) by

Q(x) : y ↦ q(x,y^{∗})x − q(x) y^{∗} .

Then Q defines a quadratic Jordan algebra on A.

==== Quadratic Jordan algebra from a linear Jordan algebra ====
Let A be a unital Jordan algebra over a field K of characteristic not equal to 2. For a in A, let L denote the left multiplication map in the associative enveloping algebra

$$L(a) : x \mapsto a x \$$

and define a K-endomorphism of A, called the quadratic representation, by

$$\displaystyle{Q(a)=2L(a)^2 -L(a^2).}$$

Then Q defines a quadratic Jordan algebra.

== Quadratic Jordan algebra defined by a linear Jordan algebra ==
The quadratic identities can be proved in a finite-dimensional Jordan algebra over R or C following Max Koecher, who used an invertible element. They are also easy to prove in a Jordan algebra defined by a unital associative algebra (a "special" Jordan algebra) since in that case Q(a)b = aba. They are valid in any Jordan algebra over a field of characteristic not equal to 2. This was conjectured by Jacobson and proved in Macdonald (1960): Macdonald showed that if a polynomial identity in three variables, linear in the third, is valid in any special Jordan algebra, then it holds in all Jordan algebras. In Jacobson (1969, pp. 19–21) an elementary proof, due to McCrimmon and Meyberg, is given for Jordan algebras over a field of characteristic not equal to 2.

=== Koecher's proof ===
Koecher's arguments apply for finite-dimensional Jordan algebras over the real or complex numbers.

==== Fundamental identity I ====
An element a in A is called invertible if it is invertible in R[a] or C[a]. If b denotes the inverse, then power associativity of a shows that L(a) and L(b) commute.

In fact a is invertible if and only if Q(a) is invertible. In that case

$$\displaystyle{Q(a)^{-1}a=a^{-1},\,\,\, Q(a^{-1})=Q(a)^{-1}.}$$

Indeed, if Q(a) is invertible it carries R[a] onto itself. On the other hand Q(a)1 = a^{2}, so

$$\displaystyle{(Q(a)^{-1} a)a=a Q(a)^{-1} a=L(a)Q(a)^{-1}a=Q(a)^{-1}a^2 =1.}$$

The Jordan identity

$$\displaystyle{[L(a),L(a^2)](b)=0}$$

can be polarized by replacing a by a + tc and taking the coefficient of t. Rewriting this as an operator applied to c yields

$$\displaystyle{2L(ab)L(a) + L(a^2)L(b)=2L(a)L(b)L(a) + L(a^2b).}$$

Taking b = a^{−1} in this polarized Jordan identity yields

$$\displaystyle{Q(a)L(a^{-1})=L(a).}$$

Replacing a by its inverse, the relation follows if L(a) and L(a^{−1}) are invertible. If not it holds for a + ε1 with ε arbitrarily small and hence also in the limit.

- If a and b are invertible then so is Q(a)b and it satisfies the inverse identity:

$$\displaystyle{(Q(a)b)^{-1}=Q(a^{-1})b^{-1}.}$$

- The quadratic representation satisfies the following fundamental identity:

$$\displaystyle{Q(Q(a)b)=Q(a)Q(b)Q(a).}$$

For c in A and F(a) a function on A with values in End A, let D_{c}F(a) be the derivative at t = 0 of F(a + tc). Then

$$\displaystyle{c=D_c(Q(a)a^{-1})=2Q(a,c)a^{-1} +Q(a)D_c(a^{-1}),}$$

where Q(a,b) if the polarization of Q

$$\displaystyle{Q(a,c)={1\over 2} (Q(a+c) -Q(a)-Q(c))=L(a)L(c) + L(c)L(a) - L(ac).}$$

Since L(a) commutes with L(a^{−1})

$$\displaystyle{Q(a,c)a^{-1}= (L(a)L(c) + L(c)L(a) - L(ac))a^{-1}=c.}$$

Hence

$$\displaystyle{c=2c +Q(a)D_c(a^{-1}),}$$

so that

$$\displaystyle{D_c(a^{-1})= - Q(a)^{-1}c.}$$

Applying D_{c} to L(a^{−1})Q(a) = L(a) and acting on b = c^{−1} yields

$$\displaystyle{(Q(a)b)(Q(a^{-1})b^{-1})=1.}$$

On the other hand L(Q(a)b) is invertible on an open dense set where Q(a)b must also be invertible with

$$\displaystyle{(Q(a)b)^{-1}=Q(a^{-1})b^{-1}.}$$

Taking the derivative D_{c} in the variable b in the expression above gives

$$\displaystyle{-Q(Q(a)b)^{-1}Q(a)c =-Q(a)^{-1}Q(b)^{-1}c.}$$

This yields the fundamental identity for a dense set of invertible elements, so it follows in general by continuity. The fundamental identity implies that c = Q(a)b is invertible if a and b are invertible and gives a formula for the inverse of Q(c). Applying it to c gives the inverse identity in full generality.

==== Commutation identity I ====
As shown above, if a is invertible,

$$\displaystyle{Q(a,b)a^{-1} =b.}$$

Taking D_{c} with a as the variable gives

$$\displaystyle{0=Q(c,b)a^{-1} + Q(a,b)D_c(a^{-1})=Q(c,b)a^{-1} -Q(a,b)Q(a)^{-1}c.}$$

Replacing a by a^{−1} gives, applying Q(a) and using the fundamental identity gives

$$\displaystyle{Q(a)Q(b,c)a= Q(a)Q(a^{-1},b)Q(a)c = \frac{1}{2}Q(a)[Q(a^{-1}+b) -Q(a^{-1}) -Q(b)]Q(a)c = Q(Q(a)b,a)c.}$$

Hence

$$\displaystyle{Q(a)Q(b,c)a=Q(Q(a)b,a)c.}$$

Interchanging b and c gives

$$\displaystyle{Q(a)Q(b,c)a=Q(a,Q(a)c)b.}$$

On the other hand R(x,y) is defined by R(x,y)z = 2 Q(x,z)y, so this implies

$$\displaystyle{Q(a)R(b,a)c=R(a,b)Q(a)c,}$$

so that for a invertible and hence by continuity for all a

$$\displaystyle{Q(a)R(b,a)=R(a,b)Q(a).}$$

=== Mccrimmon–Meyberg proof ===
==== Commutation identity II ====
The Jordan identity a(a^{2}b) = a^{2}(ab) can be polarized by replacing a by a + tc and taking the coefficient of t. This gives

$$\displaystyle{c(a^2b) + 2a (ac)b) = a^2(cb) + 2 (ac)(ab).}$$

In operator notation this implies

$$\displaystyle{[L(a^2),L(c)]+2[L(ac),L(a)]=0.}$$

Polarizing in a again gives

$$\displaystyle{c((ad)b) + d((ac)b) + a((dc)b)= (cd)(ab)+(da)(cb)+(ac)(db).}$$

Written as operators acting on d, this gives

$$\displaystyle{L(c)L(b)L(a) +L((ac)b) +L(a)L(b)L(c) = L(ab)L(c)+L(cb)L(a) +L(ac)L(b).}$$

Replacing c by b and b by a gives

$$\displaystyle{L(b)L(a)^2 +L(a(ab))+L(a)^2L(b)=L(a^2)L(b)+2L(ab)L(a).}$$

Also, since the right hand side is symmetric in b and 'c, interchanging b and c on the left and subtracting , it follows that the commutators [L(b),L(c)] are derivations of the Jordan algebra.

Let

$$\displaystyle{Q(a)=2L(a)^2 - L(a^2).}$$

Then Q(a) commutes with L(a) by the Jordan identity.

From the definitions if Q(a,b) = ½ (Q(a = b) − Q(a) − Q(b)) is the associated symmetric bilinear mapping, then Q(a,a) = Q(a) and

$$\displaystyle{Q(a,b)=L(a)L(b)+L(b)L(a)-L(ab).}$$

Moreover

$$\displaystyle{2Q(ab,a)=L(b)Q(a) +Q(a)L(b).}$$

Indeed

2Q(ab,a) − L(b)Q(a) − Q(a)L(b) = 2L(ab)L(a) + 2L(a)L(ab) − 2L(a(ab)) − 2L(a)^{2}L(b) − 2L(b)L(a)^{2} + L(a^{2})L(b) + L(b)L(a^{2}).

By the second and first polarized Jordan identities this implies

2Q(ab,a) − L(b)Q(a) − Q(a)L(b) = 2[L(a),L(ab)] + [L(b),L(a^{2})] = 0.

The polarized version of [Q(a),L(a)] = 0 is

$$\displaystyle{2[Q(a,b),L(a)]=2[L(b),Q(a)].}$$

Now with R(a,b) = 2[L(a),L(b)] + 2L(ab), it follows that

$$\displaystyle{Q(a)R(b,a)=2[Q(a)L(b),L(a)] +2Q(a)L(ab)=2[Q(ab,a),L(a)] +2[L(a),L(b)]Q(a)+2Q(a)L(ab).}$$

So by the last identity with ab in place of b this implies the commutation identity:

$$\displaystyle{Q(a)R(b,a)=2[L(a),L(b)]Q(a)+2L(ab)Q(a)=R(a,b)Q(a).}$$

The identity Q(a)R(b,a) = R(a,b)Q(a) can be strengthened to

$$\displaystyle{Q(a)R(b,a)=R(a,b)Q(a)=2Q(Q(a)b,a).}$$

Indeed applied to c, the first two terms give

$$\displaystyle{2Q(a)Q(b,c)a=2Q(Q(a)c,a)b.}$$

Switching b and c then gives

$$\displaystyle{Q(a)R(b,a)c=2Q(Q(a)b,a)c.}$$

==== Fundamental identity II ====
The identity Q(Q(a)b) = Q(a)Q(b)Q(a) is proved using the Lie bracket relations

$$\displaystyle{[R(a,b),R(c,d)]=R(R(a,b)c,d) - R(c,R(b,a)d).}$$

Indeed the polarization in c of the identity Q(c)L(x) + L(x)Q(c) = 2Q(cx,c) gives

$$\displaystyle{Q(c,y)L(x) +L(x)Q(c,y) = Q(yx,c) + Q(cx,y).}$$

Applying both sides to d, this shows that

$$\displaystyle{[L(x),R(c,d)]= R(xc,d) - R(c,xd).}$$

In particular these equations hold for x = ab. On the other hand if T = [L(a),L(b)] then D(z) = Tz is a derivation of the Jordan algebra, so that

$$\displaystyle{[T,R(c,d)] = R(Dc,d) + R(c,Dd).}$$

The Lie bracket relations follow because R(a,b) = T + L(ab).

Since the Lie bracket on the left hand side is antisymmetric,

$$\displaystyle{R(R(a,b)c,d) - R(c,R(b,a)d)=- R(R(c,d)a,b) +R(a,R(d,c)b).}$$

As a consequence

$$\displaystyle{R(y,Q(x)y)=R(y,x)^2 - 2Q(y)Q(x).}$$

Indeed set a = y, b = x, c = z, d = x and make both sides act on y.

On the other hand

$$\displaystyle{2Q(Q(a)b)=2R(a,b)Q(Q(a)b,a)-Q(a)R(b,Q(a)b).}$$

Indeed this follows by setting x = Q(a)b in

$$\displaystyle{[R(a,b),R(x,y)]a=- R(R(x,y)a,b)a +R(a,R(y,x)b)a.}$$

Hence, combining these equations with the strengthened commutation identity,

$$\displaystyle{2Q(Q(a)b)=2R(a,b)Q(Q(a)b,a)-R(b,a)Q(a)R(a,b) +2Q(a)Q(b)Q(a)=2Q(a)Q(b)Q(a).}$$

== Linear Jordan algebra defined by a quadratic Jordan algebra ==
Let A be a quadratic Jordan algebra over R or C. Following Jacobson (1969), a linear Jordan algebra structure can be associated with A such that, if L(a) is Jordan multiplication, then the quadratic structure is given by Q(a) = 2L(a)^{2} − L(a^{2}).

Firstly the axiom Q(a)R(b,a) = R (a,b)Q(a) can be strengthened to

$$\displaystyle{Q(a)R(b,a)=R(a,b)Q(a)=2Q(Q(a)b,a).}$$

Indeed applied to c, the first two terms give

$$\displaystyle{2Q(a)Q(b,c)a=2Q(Q(a)c,a)b.}$$

Switching b and c then gives

$$\displaystyle{Q(a)R(b,a)c=2Q(Q(a)b,a)c.}$$

Now let

$$\displaystyle{L(a)=\frac{1}{2}R(a,1).}$$

Replacing b by a and a by 1 in the identity above gives

$$\displaystyle{R(a,1)=R(1,a)=2Q(a,1).}$$

In particular

$$\displaystyle{L(a)=Q(a,1),\,\,\,L(1)=Q(1,1)=I.}$$

If furthermore a is invertible then

$$\displaystyle{R(a,b)=2Q(Q(a)b,a)Q(a)^{-1}= 2Q(a)Q(b,a^{-1}).}$$

Similarly if 'b is invertible

$$\displaystyle{R(a,b)= 2Q(a,b^{-1})Q(b).}$$

The Jordan product is given by

$$\displaystyle{a\circ b = L(a)b=\frac{1}{2}R(a,1)b=Q(a,b)1,}$$

so that

$$\displaystyle{a\circ b = b \circ a.}$$

The formula above shows that 1 is an identity. Defining a^{2} by a∘a = Q(a)1, the only remaining condition to be verified is the Jordan identity

$$\displaystyle{[L(a),L(a^2)]=0.}$$

In the fundamental identity

$$\displaystyle{Q(Q(a)b)= Q(a)Q(b)Q(a),}$$

Replace a by a + t, set b = 1 and compare the coefficients of t^{2} on both sides:

$$\displaystyle{Q(a)=2Q(a,1)^2 - Q(a^2,1)= 2L(a)^2 - L(a^2).}$$

Setting b = 1 in the second axiom gives

$$\displaystyle{Q(a)L(a)=L(a)Q(a),}$$

and therefore L(a) must commute with L(a^{2}).

== Shift identity ==
In a unital linear Jordan algebra the shift identity asserts that

$$\displaystyle{R(Q(a)b,b)=R(a,Q(b)a).}$$

Following Meyberg (1972), it can be established as a direct consequence of polarized forms of the fundamental identity and the commutation or homotopy identity. It is also a consequence of Macdonald's theorem since it is an operator identity involving only two variables.

For a in a unital linear Jordan algebra A the quadratic representation is given by

$$\displaystyle{Q(a)=2L(a)^2 - L(a^2),}$$

so the corresponding symmetric bilinear mapping is

$$\displaystyle{Q(a,b)=L(a)L(b)+L(b)L(a) -L(ab).}$$

The other operators are given by the formula

$$\displaystyle{\frac{1}{2}R(a,b)=L(a)L(b) -L(b)L(a) +L(ab),}$$

so that

$$\displaystyle{Q(a,b)= 2L(a)L(b)-\frac{1}{2}R(a,b).}$$

The commutation or homotopy identity

$$\displaystyle{R(a,b)Q(a)=Q(a)R(b,a)=2Q(Q(a)b,a),}$$

can be polarized in a. Replacing a by a + t1 and taking the coefficient of t gives

$$\displaystyle{L(b)Q(a)+R(a,b)L(a)=Q(a)L(b) +L(a)R(b,a)=L(Q(a)b) +2Q(ab,a).}$$

The fundamental identity

$$\displaystyle{Q(Q(a)b)=Q(a)Q(b)Q(a)}$$

can be polarized in a. Replacing a by a +t1 and taking the coefficients of t gives (interchanging a and b)

$$\displaystyle{2Q(ab,a)= Q(a)L(b) + L(b)Q(a).}$$

Combining the two previous displayed identities yields

$$\displaystyle{ L(Q(a)b)+L(b)Q(a)=L(a)R(b,a),\,\,\,\,L(Q(b)a) +Q(b)L(a)= R(b,a)L(b).}$$

Replacing a by a +t1 in the fundamental identity and taking the coefficient of t^{2} gives

$$\displaystyle{2Q(Q(a)b,b)-L(a)Q(b)L(a)= Q(a)Q(b)+Q(b)Q(a) -Q(ab).}$$

Since the right hand side is symmetric this implies

$$\displaystyle{2Q(Q(a)b,b)-2Q(Q(b)a,a)= L(a)Q(b)L(a) - L(b)Q(a)L(b).}$$

These identities can be used to prove the shift identity:

$$\displaystyle{R(Q(a)b,b)=R(a,Q(b)a).}$$

It is equivalent to the identity

$$\displaystyle{2L(Q(a)b)L(b)- Q(Q(a)b,b) = 2L(a)L(Q(b)a) -Q(a,Q(b)a).}$$

By the previous displayed identity this is equivalent to

$$\displaystyle{[L(Q(a)b)+L(b)Q(a)]L(b)= L(a)[L(Q(b)a) + Q(b)L(a)].}$$

On the other hand, the bracketed terms can be simplified by the third displayed identity. It implies that both sides are equal to ½ L(a)R(b,a)L(b).

For finite-dimensional unital Jordan algebras, the shift identity can be seen more directly using mutations. Let a and b be invertible, and let L_{b}(a)=R(a,b) be the Jordan multiplication in A^{b}. Then Q(b)L_{b}(a) = L_{a}(b)Q(b). Moreover Q(b)Q_{b}(a) = Q(b)Q(a)Q(b) =Q_{a}(b)Q(b). on the other hand Q_{b}(a)=2L_{b}(a)^{2} − L_{b}(a^{2,b}) and similarly with a and b interchanged. Hence

$$\displaystyle{L_a(b^{2,a})Q(b) =Q(b)L_b(a^{2,b}).}$$

Thus

$$\displaystyle{R(Q(b)a,a)Q(b)=Q(b)R(Q(a)b,b)=R(b,Q(a)b)Q(b),}$$

so the shift identity follows by cancelling Q(b). A density argument allows the invertibility assumption to be dropped.

== Jordan pairs ==
A linear unital Jordan algebra gives rise to a quadratic mapping Q and associated mapping R satisfying the fundamental identity, the commutation of homotopy identity and the shift identity. A Jordan pair (V_{+},V_{−}) consists of two vector space V_{±} and two quadratic mappings Q_{±} from V_{±} to V_{∓}. These determine bilinear mappings R_{±} from V_{±} × V_{∓} to V_{±} by the formula R(a,b)c = 2Q(a,c)b where 2Q(a,c) = Q(a + c) − Q(a) − Q(c). Omitting ± subscripts, these must satisfy

the fundamental identity

$$\displaystyle{Q(Q(a)b)=Q(a)Q(b)Q(a),}$$

the commutation or homotopy identity

$$\displaystyle{R(a,b)Q(a)=Q(a)R(b,a)=2Q(Q(a)b,a),}$$

and the shift identity

$$\displaystyle{R(Q(a)b,b)=R(a,Q(b)a).}$$

A unital Jordan algebra A defines a Jordan pair by taking V_{±} = A with its quadratic structure maps Q and R.

== See also ==
- Jordan triple system
- Jordan pair
- Mutation (Jordan algebra)
