= Jordan algebra =

Not-necessarily-associative commutative algebra satisfying (xy)(xx) = x(y(xx))

In abstract algebra, a Jordan algebra is a nonassociative algebra (with unit) over a field whose multiplication satisfies the following axioms:

1. $xy = yx$ (commutative law)
2. $(xx)(xy) = x((xx)y)$ (Jordan identity).

The product of two elements x and y in a Jordan algebra is also denoted x ∘ y, particularly to avoid confusion with the product of a related associative algebra.

The axioms imply that a Jordan algebra is power-associative, meaning that $x^n = x \cdots x$ is independent of how we parenthesize this expression. They also imply that $x^m (x^n y) = x^n(x^m y)$ for all positive integers m and n. Thus, we may equivalently define a Jordan algebra to be a commutative, power-associative algebra such that for any element $x$, the operations of multiplying by powers $x^n$ all commute.

Jordan algebras were introduced by Pascual Jordan (1933) in an effort to formalize the notion of an algebra of observables in quantum electrodynamics. It was soon shown that the algebras were not useful in this context, however they have since found many applications in mathematics. The algebras were originally called "r-number systems", but were renamed "Jordan algebras" by Abraham Adrian Albert (1946), who began the systematic study of general Jordan algebras.

== Special Jordan algebras ==
Notice first that an associative algebra is a Jordan algebra if and only if it is commutative.

Given any associative algebra A (not of characteristic 2), one can construct a Jordan algebra A^{+} using the same underlying addition and a new multiplication, the Jordan product defined by:
$$x\circ y = \frac{xy+yx}{2}.$$

These Jordan algebras and their subalgebras are called special Jordan algebras, while all others are exceptional Jordan algebras. This construction is analogous to the Lie algebra associated to A, whose product (Lie bracket) is defined by the commutator $[x,y] = xy - yx$.

The Shirshov–Cohn theorem states that any Jordan algebra with two generators is special. Related to this, Macdonald's theorem states that any polynomial in three variables, having degree one in one of the variables, and which vanishes in every special Jordan algebra, vanishes in every Jordan algebra.

=== Hermitian Jordan algebras ===
If (A, σ) is an associative algebra with an involution σ, then if σ(x) = x and σ(y) = y it follows that $\sigma(xy + yx) = xy + yx.$ Thus the set of all elements fixed by the involution (sometimes called the hermitian elements) form a subalgebra of A^{+}, which is sometimes denoted H(A,σ).

== Examples ==
1. The set of self-adjoint real, complex, or quaternionic matrices with multiplication

$$(xy + yx)/2$$

form a special Jordan algebra.

2. The set of 3×3 self-adjoint matrices over the octonions, again with multiplication

$$(xy + yx)/2,$$

is a 27 dimensional, exceptional Jordan algebra (it is exceptional because the octonions are not associative). This was the first example of an Albert algebra. Its automorphism group is the exceptional Lie group F_{4}. Since over the complex numbers this is the only simple exceptional Jordan algebra up to isomorphism, it is often referred to as "the" exceptional Jordan algebra. Over the real numbers there are three isomorphism classes of simple exceptional Jordan algebras.

== Derivations and structure algebra ==
A derivation of a Jordan algebra A is an endomorphism D of A such that D(xy) = D(x)y+xD(y). The derivations form a Lie algebra der(A). The Jordan identity implies that if x and y are elements of A, then the endomorphism sending z to x(yz)−y(xz) is a derivation. Thus the direct sum of A and der(A) can be made into a Lie algebra, called the structure algebra of A, str(A).

A simple example is provided by the Hermitian Jordan algebras H(A,σ). In this case any element x of A with σ(x)=−x defines a derivation. In many important examples, the structure algebra of H(A,σ) is A.

Derivation and structure algebras also form part of Tits' construction of the Freudenthal magic square.

== Formally real Jordan algebras ==
A (possibly nonassociative) algebra over the real numbers is said to be formally real if it satisfies the property that a sum of n squares can only vanish if each one vanishes individually. In 1932, Jordan attempted to axiomatize quantum theory by saying that the algebra of observables of any quantum system should be a formally real algebra that is commutative (xy = yx) and power-associative (the associative law holds for products involving only x, so that powers of any element x are unambiguously defined). He proved that any such algebra is a Jordan algebra.

Not every Jordan algebra is formally real, but Jordan, von Neumann & Wigner (1934) classified the finite-dimensional formally real Jordan algebras, also called Euclidean Jordan algebras. Every formally real Jordan algebra can be written as a direct sum of so-called simple ones, which are not themselves direct sums in a nontrivial way. In finite dimensions, the simple formally real Jordan algebras come in four infinite families, together with one exceptional case:

- The Jordan algebra of n×n self-adjoint real matrices, as above.
- The Jordan algebra of n×n self-adjoint complex matrices, as above.
- The Jordan algebra of n×n self-adjoint quaternionic matrices. as above.
- The Jordan algebra freely generated by R^{n} with the relations
  $$x^2 = \langle x, x\rangle$$
  where the right-hand side is defined using the usual inner product on R^{n}. This is sometimes called a spin factor or a Jordan algebra of Clifford type.
- The Jordan algebra of 3×3 self-adjoint octonionic matrices, as above (an exceptional Jordan algebra called the Albert algebra).

Of these possibilities, so far it appears that nature makes use only of the n×n complex matrices as algebras of observables. However, the spin factors play a role in special relativity, and all the formally real Jordan algebras are related to projective geometry.

== Peirce decomposition ==
If e is an idempotent in a Jordan algebra A (e^{2} = e) and R is the operation of multiplication by e, then

R(2R − 1)(R − 1) = 0,

so the only eigenvalues of R are 0, 1/2, 1. If the Jordan algebra A is finite-dimensional over a field of characteristic not 2, this implies that it is a direct sum of subspaces A = A_{0}(e) ⊕ A_{1/2}(e) ⊕ A_{1}(e) of the three eigenspaces. This decomposition was first considered by Jordan, von Neumann & Wigner (1934) for totally real Jordan algebras. It was later studied in full generality by Albert (1947) and called the Peirce decomposition of A relative to the idempotent e.

== Special kinds and generalizations ==
=== Infinite-dimensional Jordan algebras ===
In 1979, Efim Zelmanov classified infinite-dimensional simple (and prime non-degenerate) Jordan algebras. They are either of Hermitian or Clifford type. In particular, the only exceptional simple Jordan algebras are finite-dimensional Albert algebras, which have dimension 27.

=== Jordan operator algebras ===
The theory of operator algebras has been extended to cover Jordan operator algebras.

The counterparts of C*-algebras are JB algebras, which in finite dimensions are called Euclidean Jordan algebras. The norm on the real Jordan algebra must be complete and satisfy the axioms:

$$\displaystyle{\|a\circ b\|\le \|a\|\cdot \|b\|,\,\,\, \|a^2\|=\|a\|^2,\,\,\, \|a^2\|\le \|a^2 +b^2\|.}$$

These axioms guarantee that the Jordan algebra is formally real, so that, if a sum of squares of terms is zero, those terms must be zero. The complexifications of JB algebras are called Jordan C*-algebras or JB*-algebras. They have been used extensively in complex geometry to extend Koecher's Jordan algebraic treatment of bounded symmetric domains to infinite dimensions. Not all JB algebras can be realized as Jordan algebras of self-adjoint operators on a Hilbert space, exactly as in finite dimensions. The exceptional Albert algebra is the common obstruction.

The Jordan algebra analogue of von Neumann algebras is played by JBW algebras. These turn out to be JB algebras which, as Banach spaces, are the dual spaces of Banach spaces. Much of the structure theory of von Neumann algebras can be carried over to JBW algebras. In particular the JBW factors—those with center reduced to R—are completely understood in terms of von Neumann algebras. Apart from the exceptional Albert algebra, all JWB factors can be realised as Jordan algebras of self-adjoint operators on a Hilbert space closed in the weak operator topology. Of these the spin factors can be constructed very simply from real Hilbert spaces. All other JWB factors are either the self-adjoint part of a von Neumann factor or its fixed point subalgebra under a period 2 *-antiautomorphism of the von Neumann factor.

=== Jordan rings ===
A Jordan ring is a generalization of Jordan algebras, requiring only that the Jordan ring be over a general ring rather than a field. Alternatively one can define a Jordan ring as a commutative nonassociative ring that respects the Jordan identity.

=== Jordan superalgebras ===
Jordan superalgebras were introduced by Kac, Kantor and Kaplansky; these are $\mathbb{Z}/2$-graded algebras $J_0 \oplus J_1$ where $J_0$ is a Jordan algebra and $J_1$ has a "Lie-like" product with values in $J_0$.

Any $\mathbb{Z}/2$-graded associative algebra $A_0 \oplus A_1$ becomes a Jordan superalgebra with respect to the graded Jordan brace

$$\{x_i,y_j\} = x_i y_j + (-1)^{ij} y_j x_i \ .$$

Jordan simple superalgebras over an algebraically closed field of characteristic 0 were classified by Kac (1977). They include several families and some exceptional algebras, notably $K_3$ and $K_{10}$.

=== J-structures ===
The concept of J-structure was introduced by Springer (1998) to develop a theory of Jordan algebras using linear algebraic groups and axioms taking the Jordan inversion as basic operation and Hua's identity as a basic relation. In characteristic not equal to 2 the theory of J-structures is essentially the same as that of Jordan algebras.

=== Quadratic Jordan algebras ===
Quadratic Jordan algebras are a generalization of (linear) Jordan algebras introduced by Kevin McCrimmon (1966). The fundamental identities of the quadratic representation of a linear Jordan algebra are used as axioms to define a quadratic Jordan algebra over a field of arbitrary characteristic. There is a uniform description of finite-dimensional simple quadratic Jordan algebras, independent of characteristic: in characteristic not equal to 2 the theory of quadratic Jordan algebras reduces to that of linear Jordan algebras.

== See also ==
- Freudenthal algebra
- Jordan triple system
- Jordan pair
- Kantor–Koecher–Tits construction
- Scorza variety
