= Hua's identity =

Formula relating pairs of elements in a division ring

In algebra, Hua's identity named after Hua Luogeng, states that for any elements a, b in a division ring,
$$a - \left(a^{-1} + \left(b^{-1} - a\right)^{-1}\right)^{-1} = aba$$
whenever $ab \ne 0, 1$. Replacing $b$ with $-b^{-1}$ gives another equivalent form of the identity:
$$\left(a + ab^{-1}a\right)^{-1} + (a + b)^{-1} = a^{-1}.$$

== Hua's theorem ==
The identity is used in a proof of Hua's theorem, which states that if $\sigma$ is a function between division rings satisfying
$$\sigma(a + b) = \sigma(a) + \sigma(b), \quad \sigma(1) = 1, \quad \sigma(a^{-1}) = \sigma(a)^{-1},$$
then $\sigma$ is a homomorphism or an antihomomorphism. This theorem is connected to the fundamental theorem of projective geometry.

== Proof of the identity ==
One has
$$(a - aba)\left(a^{-1} + \left(b^{-1} - a\right)^{-1}\right) = 1 - ab + ab\left(b^{-1} - a\right)\left(b^{-1} - a\right)^{-1} = 1.$$

The proof is valid in any ring as long as $a, b, ab - 1$ are units.
