= Malcev algebra =

In mathematics, a Malcev algebra (or Maltsev algebra or Moufang–Lie algebra) over a field is a nonassociative algebra that is antisymmetric, so that

$$xy = -yx$$

and satisfies the Malcev identity

$$(xy)(xz) = ((xy)z)x + ((yz)x)x + ((zx)x)y.$$

They were first defined by Anatoly Maltsev (1955).

Malcev algebras play a role in the theory of Moufang loops that generalizes the role of Lie algebras in the theory of groups. Namely, just as the tangent space of the identity element of a Lie group forms a Lie algebra, the tangent space of the identity of a smooth Moufang loop forms a Malcev algebra. Moreover, just as a Lie group can be recovered from its Lie algebra under certain supplementary conditions, a smooth Moufang loop can be recovered from its Malcev algebra if certain supplementary conditions hold. For example, this is true for a connected, simply connected real-analytic Moufang loop.

== Examples ==
- Any Lie algebra is a Malcev algebra.
- Any alternative algebra may be made into a Malcev algebra by defining the Malcev product to be xy − yx.
- The 7-sphere may be given the structure of a smooth Moufang loop by identifying it with the unit octonions. The tangent space of the identity of this Moufang loop may be identified with the 7-dimensional space of imaginary octonions. The imaginary octonions form a Malcev algebra with the Malcev product xy − yx.

== Kernel ==
In the case of Malcev algebras, this construction can be simplified. Every Malcev algebra has a special neutral element (the zero vector in the case of vector spaces, the identity element in the case of commutative groups, and the zero element in the case of rings or modules). The characteristic feature of a Malcev algebra is that we can recover the entire equivalence relation ker f from the equivalence class of the neutral element.

To be specific, let A and B be Malcev algebraic structures of a given type and let f be a homomorphism of that type from A to B. If e_{B} is the neutral element of B, then the kernel of f is the preimage of the singleton set {e_{B}}; that is, the subset of A consisting of all those elements of A that are mapped by f to the element e_{B}. The kernel is usually denoted ker f (or a variation). In symbols:

$$\operatorname{ker} f = \{a \in A : f(a) = e_{B}\} .$$

Since a Malcev algebra homomorphism preserves neutral elements, the identity element e_{A} of A must belong to the kernel. The homomorphism f is injective if and only if its kernel is only the singleton set {e_{A}}.

The notion of ideal generalises to any Malcev algebra (as linear subspace in the case of vector spaces, normal subgroup in the case of groups, two-sided ideals in the case of rings, and submodule in the case of modules). It turns out that ker f is not a subalgebra of A, but it is an ideal. Then it makes sense to speak of the quotient algebra G / (ker f). The first isomorphism theorem for Malcev algebras states that this quotient algebra is naturally isomorphic to the image of f (which is a subalgebra of B).

The connection between this and the congruence relation for more general types of algebras is as follows. First, the kernel-as-an-ideal is the equivalence class of the neutral element e_{A} under the kernel-as-a-congruence. For the converse direction, we need the notion of quotient in the Mal'cev algebra (which is division on either side for groups and subtraction for vector spaces, modules, and rings). Using this, elements a and b of A are equivalent under the kernel-as-a-congruence if and only if their quotient a/b is an element of the kernel-as-an-ideal.

== See also ==
- Malcev-admissible algebra
