= McInnes =

McInnes is a surname. Notable people with the surname include:

- Alan McInnes, Australian cricketer
- Alison McInnes (born 1957), Scottish politician (Liberal Democrat MSP)
- Andrew McInnes (born 1992), Australian rules footballer
- Angus McInnes (fl. 1897–1903), Scottish football player (Burnley FC)
- Cameron McInnes (born 1994), Australian Rugby League player
- Charlie McInnes (1916–1992), Australian rules footballer
- Colin McInnes (disambiguation), several people:

- Colin J. McInnes, health and foreign policy consultant, especially HIV/AIDS and security
- Colin R. McInnes, Scottish engineer known for his work in solar sails

- Derek McInnes (born 1971), Scottish football player and manager
- Donald McInnes (violist) (1939–2024), American violist and viola teacher
- Donald McInnes, later MacInnes (1824–1900), Canadian businessman and politician
- Donald P. McInnes (1933–2015), dairy farmer and political figure in Nova Scotia, Canada
- Dugald McInnes (1877–1929), Canadian sport shooter in the 1908 Summer Olympics
- Gavin McInnes (born 1970), Canadian far-right commentator and Proud Boys founder
- Geoff McInnes (1909–1988), Australian rules footballer
- George McInnes (born 1946), Australian rules footballer
- Herman McInnes (1862–1923), politician in Alberta, Canada and Edmontona councillor
- Hugh McInnes (1815–1879), Scottish recipient of the Victoria Cross
- Ian McInnes (born 1967), Scottish footballer
- James Campbell McInnes (1874–1945), English baritone singer and teacher
- James McInnes (1901–1974), British Labour Member of Parliament (MP) for Glasgow Central
- Joe McInnes (1932–2021), Scottish football player
- John McInnes (disambiguation) various people:

- John McInnes (Australian footballer) (1884–1950), Australian footballer
- John McInnes (footballer, born 1923) (1923–1998), Scottish footballer
- John McInnes (footballer, born 1927) (1927–1973), Scottish footballer
- John McInnes (politician) (1878–1950), South Australian politician from 1927 to 1950
- John McInnes (ski jumper) (born 1939), Canadian ski jumper at the 1964 and 1968 Winter Olympics

- Liz McInnes, British politician (Labour MP)
- Lois Curfman McInnes, American applied mathematician
- Mel McInnes (1915–1996), Australian cricket Test match umpire
- Neil McInnes (Australian journalist) (1924–2017), Australian journalist and civil servant
- Neil McInnes (politician) (1924–2005), Australian politician
- Robin McInnes (born 1949), Isle of Wight authority on coastal processes
- Stewart McInnes (1937–2015), lawyer, arbitrator and former politician
- Thomas Robert McInnes (1840–1904), Canadian physician and politician, Lt Governor of British Columbia
- Tom McInnes (disambiguation), several people:

- Tom McInnes (footballer, born 1869) (1869–1939), Scottish football player
- Tom McInnes (footballer, born 1873) (1873–1937), Scottish football player

- William McInnes (born 1963), Australian actor
- William Beckwith McInnes (1889–1939), Australian portrait painter, multiple Archibald Prize winner
- William C. McInnes (1923–2009), American Jesuit and academic
- William Wallace Burns McInnes (1871–1954), Canadian politician, lawyer and Yukon's fifth Commissioner

== See also ==
- William Joseph McInnes Botanic Garden and Campus Arboretum, on the campus of Mills College in Oakland, California, USA
- MacInnes
- MacInnis
