= List of Makdougall Brisbane Prize winners =

This is a list of winners of the biennial Makdougall Brisbane Prize for particular distinction in the promotion of scientific research, latterly restyled as the annually awarded Makdougall Brisbane Medal for early career achievement in the physical sciences, of the Royal Society of Edinburgh. It is not to be confused with the similarly named award given by the Royal Scottish Society of Arts.

Makdougall Brisbane Prize

Sources (to 2002): RSE and RSE

- 1859 – Roderick Murchison
- 1860–62 – William Seller
- 1862–64 – Sir John Denis Macdonald
- 1864–66
- 1866–68 – Alexander Crum Brown and Thomas Richard Fraser (joint)
- 1868–70 – Not awarded
- 1870–72 – George Allman
- 1872–74 – Joseph Lister
- 1874–76 – Alexander Buchan
- 1876–78 – Archibald Geikie
- 1878–80 – Charles Piazzi Smyth
- 1880–82 – James Geikie
- 1882–84 – Edward Sang
- 1884–86 – Sir John Murray
- 1886–88 – Archibald Geikie (only Fellow twice awarded the prize)
- 1888–90 – Ludwig Becker
- 1890–92 – Hugh Robert Mill
- 1892–94 – James Walker
- 1894–96 – John Gray McKendrick
- 1896–98 – William Peddie
- 1898–1900 – Ramsay Traquair
- 1900–02 – Arthur T. Masterman
- 1902–04 – John Dougall
- 1904–06 – Jakob Karl Ernst Halm
- 1906–08 – David Thomas Gwynne-Vaughan
- 1908–10 – Ernest Wedderburn
- 1910–12 – John Brownlee
- 1912–14 – Charles Robertson Marshall
- 1914–16 – Robert Alexander Houstoun
- 1916–18 – Abercrombie Lawson
- 1918–20 – Joseph Wedderburn
- 1920–22 – William Thomas Gordon
- 1922–24 – Herbert Stanley Allen
- 1924–26 – Charles Morley Wenyon, protozoologist
- 1926–28 – William Ogilvy Kermack
- 1928–30
- 1930–32 – Alexander Aitken
- 1932–34 – Alfred Ernest Henderson Cameron
- 1934–36 – Ernest Masson Anderson
- 1936–38 – David Meredith Seares Watson
- 1938–40 – Edward Lindsay Ince
- 1940–42 – William Wright Smith
- 1942–44 – Max Born and Peng Huanwu
- 1944–46 – William Black
- 1946–48 - Mowbray Ritchie
- 1948–50
- 1950–52 – Edward Maitland Wright
- 1952–54 – William Charles Osman Hill
- 1954–56 – Maurice Yonge
- 1956–58 – Ian Sneddon
- 1958–60
- 1960–62 – Edward McWilliam Patterson
- 1962–64 – Arthur Holmes
- 1964–66 – Daniel Edwin Rutherford
- 1966–68 – James Norman Davidson
- 1968–70 – Norman Feather
- 1970–72
- 1972–74 – David Paton Cuthbertson
- 1974–76 – Frederick Valentine Atkinson
- 1976–78
- 1978–80 – Walter Eric Spear
- 1980–82 – William Fleming Hoggan Jarrett
- 1982–84 – John Henderson Knox
- 1984–86 – Malcolm Andrew Ferguson-Smith
- 1988
- 1990
- 1992 – Tom Brown, University of Oxford
- 1994 - Gordon Hayward
- 1996 – Mike Ferguson, University of Dundee
- 1998 – Weiping Lu, Heriot Watt University (67th award)
- 1999 – Anne Neville – Professor, School of Mechanical Engineering, Leeds
- 2001 – Dario Alessi
- 2003 – James Wright
- 2005 – Colin McInnes
- 2007 – Andrew Baker
- 2009

Makdougall Brisbane Medal

- 2012 – Sharon Ashbrook, University of St Andrews and Rob Jenkins, University of York
- 2013 - Aidan Robson, University of Glasgow
- 2014 - Per Ola Kristensson and Catherine Cazin, University of St Andrews
- 2015 - Stefan Hild, University of Glasgow
- 2016 - Malcolm Macdonald, University of Strathclyde
- 2017 - Stephen Brusatte, University of Edinburgh
- 2018 - Kimberley Kavanagh, University of Strathclyde
- 2019 - Martin Lavery, University of Glasgow
- 2021 - Mehul Malik, Heriot-Watt University
- 2022 - Jonathan Fraser, University of St Andrews

== See also ==
- List of general science and technology awards
