= John Stephenson (zoologist) =

British surgeon and zoologist

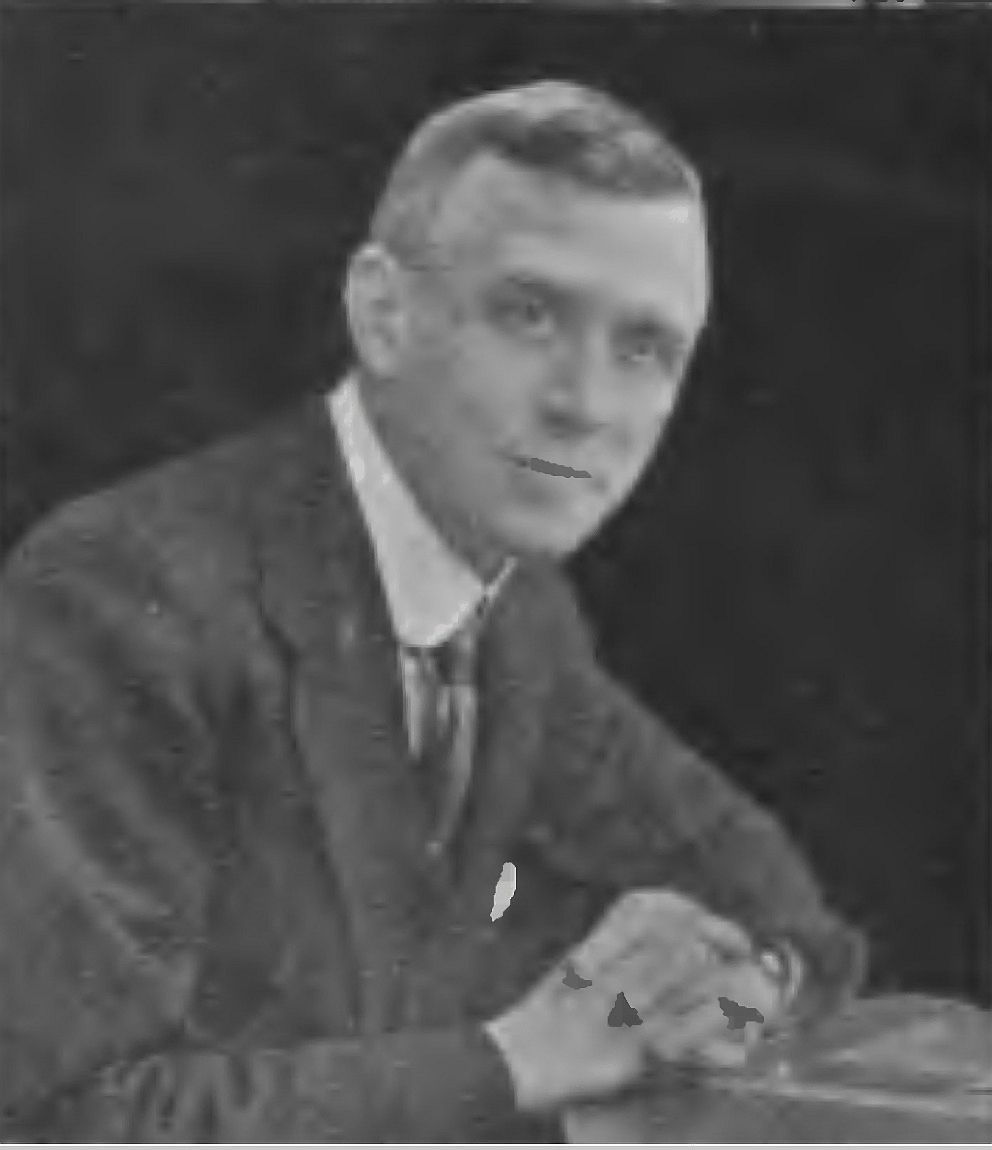

John Stephenson CIE FRS FRSE FRCS (6 February 1871, in Padiham, Lancashire – 2 February 1933, in London) was a surgeon and zoologist. He was a leading expert on the earthworms of the Indian subcontinent and served as editor of the Fauna of British India series from 1927. Knowledgeable in Persian, Hindustani and some Arabic, he was an orientalist scholar and translated several works from Persian to English.He also served as the Principal of Government College, Lahore from 1912 to 1919.

== Life ==
Stephenson was born in Padiham and was educated at Burnley Grammar School, matriculated from Owen's College, Manchester and graduated there with a B.Sc. (Lond.) in 1890 and M.B., B.Chir. (Manc.) in 1893. Stephenson was a house physician from 1893 to 1894 at the Manchester Royal Infirmary and then in 1894 at the Royal Hospital for Diseases of the Chest, London. He had also studied zoology under A. Milnes Marshall. He joined the Indian Medical Service as a lieutenant on 29 July 1895. He became captain on 29 July 1898, major on 29 January 1907, and lieutenant-colonel on 29 January 1915, retiring with that rank on 6 September 1921.

In India he was for some years engaged in military duties; he saw field service with the Tirah Expeditionary Force in 1897–98, for which he was awarded the medal and clasp, and for a time he was placed on plague duty. In 1898 he was appointed Medical Officer to the 2nd (later 22nd) Punjab Cavalry and from 1900 to 1906 he held civil surgeoncies at Peshawar, Ambala and other stations in north-west India.

On 14 December 1905 Stephenson was elected a Fellow of the Royal College of Surgeons in London. In 1909 he received an honorary doctorate (DSc) from the University of London.

The Lahore Medical College did not find qualified teachers in zoology and Stephenson was invited by his friend the Lieutenant Governor of the Punjab, Sir Denzil Ibbetson. In 1906 he became Professor of Biology at the Government College in Lahore and in 1912 became Professor of Zoology and also Principal of the College. He retained these posts until he left the Indian Medical Service early in 1920, and returned to Britain. In 1912 he was elected a Fellow of the Royal Society of Edinburgh. His proposers were Charles Robertson Marshall, Arthur Robinson, D'Arcy Wentworth Thompson and William Peddie. He won the Society's Keith Medal for the period 1917 to 1919. He was made CIE in 1919. From 1920 to 1929 he was a lecturer in Zoology at the University of Edinburgh.

Stephenson was proficient in Hindustani, Persian and later studied Pashtu, Punjabi and had some knowledge of Arabic. He translated into English and published in 1910 the Hadiqat al Haqiqa, a work by the sufi poet Sanā'i. He left Edinburgh University in 1929 to work at the Natural History Museum, London as editor of the Fauna of British India series following the death of Arthur Shipley.

== Family ==
In 1895 he married Gertrude Bayne, who outlived him. There were no children from the marriage.

== Awards and honours ==
- 1912 — Fellow of the Royal Society of Edinburgh
- 1919 — Commander of the Order of the Indian Empire
- 1930 — Fellow of the Royal Society of London

In 1914, botanist S.R. Kashyap published Stephensoniella, a genus of liverwort in (Exormothecaceae family) and named in his honour.

== Selected publications ==
- as author:
  - Oligochaeta. In the series: Fauna of British India including Ceylon and Burma. London: Taylor & Francis. 1923.
  - Intelligence exercises in English. Oxford. 1927.
  - The oligochaeta. Oxford: Clarendon Press. 1930.
- as translator:
  - Sanāʾī al-Ghaznavī, Abū al-Majd Majdūd ibn Ādam (1910). The first book of the Ḥadīqatuʻl-ḥaqīqat; or, The enclosed garden of the truth; ed. and tr. by J. Stephenson. Calcutta: Printed at the Baptist mission press.
