= Centre for Health and International Relations =

Welsh research institute

The Centre for Health and International Relations (CHAIR), founded in 2003, is a research institute that specializes in international relations, foreign policy, security and health and its interconnections. CHAIR is based in the Department of International Politics, Aberystwyth University, Aberystwyth, Wales. The founder and director is Professor Colin McInnes.

== Research areas ==
In addition to research into the global politics of health broadly defined, CHAIR is also involved in research in the following areas:

- Global health governance, particularly the role of international organisations in generating what are often inchoate responses to health crises. In this context, CHAIR embarked on a major, European Research Council-funded project in 2009 entitled 'The Transformation of Global Health Governance: Competing World Views and Crises', in association with the Centre on Global Change and Health at the London School of Hygiene and Tropical Medicine.
- Politics and securitization of infectious disease, especially HIV/AIDS.
- Role of the World Health Organization and International Health Regulations in the global governance of health.
- Inter-relationship of health, peace, and conflict.
- The issue of access to medicine.

== Staff ==
- Professor Colin McInnes – Director
- Dr Simon Rushton – Research Fellow
- Dr Owain David Williams – Research Fellow
- Dr Marie Woodling
- Dr Rachel J. Owen
- Hannah Hughes
- Sonja Kittelsen

Associated staff working on the ongoing 'The Transformation of Global Health Governance: Competing World Views and Crises' project from the London School of Hygiene and Tropical Medicine:

- Professor Kelley Lee
- Dr Adam Kamradt-Scott
- Dr David Reubi
