= Ernest Wedderburn =

Scottish lawyer

Sir Ernest Wedderburn OBE, DL, FRSE, WS

Deputy Keeper of Her Majesty's Signet
- In office 1935–1954

Chairman of the General Council of Solicitors in Scotland
- In office 1936–1949

Personal details
- Born: Ernest MacLagan Wedderburn; 3 February 1884 Forfar, Scotland
- Died: 3 June 1958 (aged 74) Edinburgh, Scotland
- Citizenship: United Kingdom
- Spouse: Mary
- Relations: Joseph Wedderburn (brother)
- Education: University of Edinburgh
- Profession: Solicitor
- Awards: OBE

Military service
- Branch/service: Ordnance Committee
- Rank: Assistant Director of Experiments

Sir Ernest MacLagan Wedderburn OBE DL FRSE WS (3 February 1884 – 3 June 1958) was a Scottish lawyer, and a significant figure both in the civic life of Edinburgh and in the legal establishment. He held the posts of Professor of Conveyancing in the University of Edinburgh (1922–35), Deputy Keeper of the Signet (1935–54), and Chairman of the General Council of Solicitors (1936–49), the forerunner to the Law Society of Scotland, and chaired the latter 1949/50. He was also an enthusiastic amateur scientist, and first Treasurer then Vice President of the Royal Society of Edinburgh.

== Early life ==
Wedderburn was born in Forfar, Forfarshire in 1884, the son of Anne Oglivie and her husband (and cousin), Dr Alexander Stormonth MacLagan Wedderburn of Pearsie. He was one of 14 children, and the younger brother of Joseph Wedderburn, who became Professor of Mathematics at Princeton and conceive the Wedderburn–Etherington number and Artin–Wedderburn theorem. He was distantly related, through his father, to 18th-century Lord of Session, Peter Wedderburn, Lord Chesterhall, and to the latter's son, Lord Chancellor Alexander Wedderburn, 1st Earl of Rosslyn.

He was educated at George Watson's College then studied law at the University of Edinburgh, graduating with an MA in 1904 and an LLB in 1907. During this period he lived with his uncle J R M Wedderburn at 3 Glencairn Crescent in Edinburgh.

From 1904 he also had practical experience in the offices of Gillespie & Paterson WS at 31 Melville Street.

He qualified as a Writer to the Signet in 1907 and then joined his uncle's firm of Carment, Wedderburn & Watson WS based at 2 Glenfinlas Street off Charlotte Square.

During World War I, he served as Meteorological Officer to GHQ. While employed with the Ordnance Committee, his aptitude for mathematics enabled him to establish a new system for calculating the allowance to be made for ballistic winds in long-range artillery shooting, which had been widely adopted by the end of the war. He was appointed Assistant Director of Experiments at the Ministry of Defence's site at Shoeburyness, Essex, was mentioned twice in despatches and awarded a military OBE.

== Career ==
Wedderburn joined the firm of Carment, Wedderburn and Watson. The Wedderburn of the firm's name was Joseph Robert Maclagan Wedderburn (1850–1936), Ernest's paternal uncle, who in 1922 would lead the merger with Guild and Shepherd which would form Shepherd and Wedderburn, now one of Scotland's largest law firms.

Ernest practised with the firm until that merger in 1922, when he took up the post of Professor of Conveyancing in the Faculty of Law of the University of Edinburgh, in succession to Professor Mounsey. During this time he pioneered the employment of small tutorial-sized classes in his teaching, a practice which continued until instruction in drafting was removed from undergraduate studies to the Diploma in Legal Practice in 1981. He demitted the Chair in 1935, and was succeeded by Harry H. Monteath. In 1938, the University awarded him the honorary degree of Doctor of Laws.

Upon his retirement from the Edinburgh Chair in 1935, Wedderburn became Deputy Keeper of the Signet, the most senior member of the Society of Writers to Her Majesty's Signet. In civil actions in the Court of Session, a pursuer is required to have his writ stamped with the Signet to give him authority from the Crown to serve the writ on the defender. That conferral, called "passing the Signet," was until 1976 carried out by the Signet Office, the administration of which was one of the Society's responsibilities. The office of Keeper of the Signet is held by the Lord Clerk Register (the oldest surviving of the Great Officers of State, which at the time was held by Walter Erskine, 12th Earl of Mar) but is a purely ceremonial one, the Deputy Keeper instead being the most senior membership representative in the Society's administration.

A year later he took up the post of Chairman of the General Council of Solicitors in Scotland. This body had been established a few years before by the Solicitors (Scotland) Act 1933 as the first national body for the solicitors' profession, with responsibilities for the education and training of solicitors and for enforcing standards of conduct, and its membership drawn from representatives of local faculties. Admission to practice was still controlled by these local bodies, such as the Society of Advocates in Aberdeen, Royal Faculty of Procurators in Glasgow, and in Wedderburn's case the WS Society. The Act had also established the Independent Discipline Committee, before which cases by the General Council against mischievous solicitors were to be brought.

Wedderburn was knighted in the 1942 Birthday Honours. A 1946 photographic portrait of him by the Bassano studio, taken in his capacity as Chairman of the General Council, is held by the National Portrait Gallery, London.

Accounts of the General Council's efficacy are unfavourable, mostly citing lack of funds, and it was replaced in 1949 by a new body, the Law Society of Scotland. This body assumed the responsibility of registering all solicitors and taking cases before the new Solicitors' Discipline Tribunal, as well as charging registration fees to prevent some of the issues faced by its predecessor. Wedderburn served as Chairman of the Law Society in its first year, resigning in 1950.

== Science ==
Although a lawyer by trade, Wedderburn had a keen interest in science. During World War I he found a new system for calculating the allowance to be made for ballistic winds in long-range artillery shooting, which had been widely adopted by the end of the war. While a student he worked, in the University's vacations, with Sir John Murray on the bathymetrical study of fresh water lochs. He continued this enthusiasm in later in life, following George Chrystal's work on seiches on the Scottish lochs.

He was elected a Fellow of the Royal Society of Edinburgh on 21 January 1907. His proposers were Sir John Murray, George Chrystal, Thomas Nicol Johnston, and William Peddie. Wedderburn won the society's Makdougall-Brisbane Prize for 1908/1910 and was an active member of the society, proposing many notable scientists for membership and serving as treasurer for ten years, from 1937 to 1947. He served as vice president from 1947 to 1950.

He was closely involved with the Scottish Meteorological Society, and published an article on its history in the November 1955 edition of the journal Weather.

== Retirement and death ==
Wedderburn remained Deputy Keeper of the Signet throughout his tenure as Chairman of the General Council, retiring from the position in 1954. He died on 3 June 1958 at his home at 6 Succoth Gardens, in Edinburgh's West End.

== Family ==
On 5 April 1911, he married Mary Goldie (1899-1979), eldest daughter of Rev Thomas Smith Goldie, minister of Granton. Their son, Ernest Alexander Maclagan Wedderburn, a Major in the Royal Scots, was killed on 24 December 1944, and is buried in the Ancona War Cemetery, Italy.
