= Exormotheca martins-loussaoae =

Scientific classification
- Kingdom: Plantae
- Division: Marchantiophyta
- Class: Marchantiopsida
- Order: Marchantiales
- Family: Corsiniaceae
- Genus: Exormotheca
- Species: E. martins-loussaoae

Binomial name
- Exormotheca martins-loussaoae Sim-Sim, A.Martins, J.Patiño & C.A.Garcia

Species of liverworts

Exormotheca martins-loussaoae is a species of liverwort in the family Exormothecaceae, endemic to Cabo Verde.

== Distribution ==
Exormotheca martins-loussaoae is endemic to Cabo Verde, occurring in the islands of Fogo, São Nicolau and Santo Antão. It grows on volcanic rocky slopes at altitudes of 165‒1480 m above sea level.

== Etymology ==
It is named after the Portuguese botanist Maria Amélia Martins-Loução.
