= John McInnes =

John McInnes or MacInnes may refer to:

- John McInnes (Australian footballer) (1884–1950), Australian footballer
- John McInnes (footballer, born 1923), Scottish footballer
- John McInnes (footballer, born 1927) (1927–1973), Scottish footballer
- John McInnes (politician) (1878–1950), South Australian politician from 1927 to 1950
- John McInnes (ski jumper) (born 1939), Canadian ski jumper at the 1964 and 1968 Winter Olympics
- John MacInnes (Gaelic scholar) (1930–2019), Scottish Gaelic scholar
- John MacInnes (writer) (born 1969), writer for the game Call of Duty: Advanced Warfare in 2014
- John MacInnes (ice hockey) (1925–1983), Canadian ice hockey player and coach

== See also ==
- John McInnis (disambiguation)
