= Edward Patterson =

Edward Patterson may refer to:

- Edward White Patterson (1895–1940), U.S. Representative from Kansas
- Edward McWilliam Patterson (1926–2013), English mathematician
