= Tom McInnis =

Tom McInnis may refer to:

- Tom McInnis (Canadian politician)
- Tom McInnis (North Carolina politician)

== See also ==
- Thomas McInnes (disambiguation)
