= Alexander G. Burgess =

(1872 – 1932) Scottish mathematician

Alexander George Burgess
- Born: 24 December 1872; Wishaw, Lanarkshire, Scotland
- Died: 29 March 1932 (aged 59); Rothesay, Bute, Scotland
- Education: University of Edinburgh
- Known for: Tripolar Co-ordinates
- Awards: FRSE (1902)
- Scientific career
- Workplaces: Rothesay Academy, Bute

Alexander G. Burgess FRSE FEIS (24 December 1872 – 29 March 1932) was a Scottish mathematician. He served as president of the Edinburgh Mathematical Society. He is noted for his work on Tripolar Co-ordinates.

== Biography ==
He was born in Wishaw, Lanarkshire in southern Scotland in 1872.

He attended Wishaw Academy and then George Watson's College in Edinburgh. In 1890 he won a bursary allowing him to study mathematics and natural philosophy at the University of Edinburgh receiving an MA degree in 1894. He studied under Professor George Chrystal.

He became a teacher at Merchiston Castle School. From there he moved to Rothesay Academy and Edinburgh Ladies' College before returning to Rothesay as Rector of Rothesay Academy and the Thomson Institute in 1917.

He died on 29 March 1932.

== Contributions and service ==
In 1900 he became a member of the Edinburgh Mathematical Society, presenting at least 13 papers to the body over his membership. He served as its Secretary 1908–11, Vice-president 1911–12 and President 1912–13. During this period he organised the first Mathematical Colloquium in the city.

== Recognition ==
In 1902 he was elected a Fellow of the Royal Society of Edinburgh.

The University of Edinburgh awarded him an honorary Doctorate (DSc) in 1924, specifically for his thesis on Tripolar Co-ordinates.
