= Colin McInnes =

Colin McInnes may refer to:

- Colin R. McInnes (born 1968), British engineer
- Colin J. McInnes, expert in the relationship between health and foreign and security policy

== See also ==
- Colin MacInnes (1914–1976), English novelist
