= Ernst Snapper =

Dutch-American mathematician (1913–2011)

Ernst Snapper (December 2, 1913, Groningen – February 5, 2011, Chapel Hill, North Carolina) was a Dutch-American mathematician, known for his research in commutative algebra, algebraic geometry, cohomology of groups, character theory, and combinatorics.

== Biography ==
Ernst Snapper, born to a Jewish family in the Netherlands, received in 1936 the equivalent of a master's degree from the University of Amsterdam. In 1938 his father, Isidore Snapper, an internationally known physician and medical researcher, accepted an offer to become the director of medical research at the Rockefeller Foundation's Peking Union Medical College. Acting on a suggestion from Abraham Flexner, Isidore Snapper encouraged Ernst Snapper to apply to Princeton University to become a graduate student. As a doctoral student of Joseph Wedderburn, Ernst Snapper graduated with a Ph.D. from Princeton University in 1941. In China, his father and mother were interned by the Japanese, but were later released in an exchange. Ernst Snapper was an instructor from 1941 to 1945 at Princeton University. He was a professor of mathematics from 1945 to 1955 at the University of Southern California, from 1955 to 1958 at Miami University of Ohio, from 1958 to 1963 at Indiana University, and from 1963 to 1979 at Dartmouth College, where he retired as professor emeritus. He was a visiting professor for the academic years 1949–1950 and 1954–1955 at Princeton University and for the academic year 1953–1954 at Harvard University.

An early sequence of papers extended the Steinitz field theory to completely primary rings using ideas from the work of Krull. During his visits at Princeton and Harvard, Snapper studied algebraic geometry and the homological and sheaf-theoretic methods of Serre and Grothendieck. Later he applied those methods in several important papers on the polynomial properties of the Euler characteristic associated with divisor classes of an irreducible normal projective variety. He continued using homological methods in a sequence of papers in which he extended the classical cohomology of groups to the cohomology of arbitrary permutation representations of finite groups. Snapper then applied these methods to obtain a classical result on Frobenius kernels. In the area of combinatorial mathematics, Snapper extended de Bruijn’s theory of the cycle index of a finite group to that of an arbitrary permutation representation. A subsequent paper coauthored with Arunas Rudvalis extended this cycle index to a generalized cycle index of a permutation representation paired with a class function. They then obtained the theorem of Frobenius that every simple character of the symmetric group is an integral linear combination of transitive permutation characters.

His doctoral students include Arunas Rudvalis. Snapper's paper The Three Crises in Mathematics: Logicism, Intuitionism and formalism won the 1980 Carl B. Allendoerfer Award.

He was married to Ethel K. Snapper (1917–1995) for nearly 60 years. Upon his death he was survived by his two sons, John and James, both of whom were graduates of Princeton University, and two granddaughters. John Snapper received his Ph.D. in philosophy from the University of Chicago and became a professor at Illinois Institute of Technology. James Robert Snapper received his M.D. from Harvard Medical School in 1974 and became a pulmonologist and consulting professor in the department of medicine of Duke University School of Medicine.

Ernst Snapper corresponded with Leo Vroman, who was his cousin.

== Selected publications ==
=== Articles ===
- Snapper, Ernst (1947). "Polynomial Matrices in One Variable, Differential Equations and Module Theory". American Journal of Mathematics. 69 (2): 299–326. doi:10.2307/2371854. JSTOR 2371854. S2CID 123982270.
- Snapper, Ernst (1949). "Completely Indecomposable Modules". Canadian Journal of Mathematics. 1 (2): 125–152. doi:10.4153/CJM-1949-013-3. S2CID 124525144.
- Snapper, E. (1950). "Completely Primary Rings. I". Annals of Mathematics. 52 (3): 666–693. doi:10.2307/1969441. JSTOR 1969441.
- Snapper, Ernst (1950). "Periodic Linear Transformations of Affine and Projective Geometries". Canadian Journal of Mathematics. 2: 149–151. doi:10.4153/CJM-1950-013-9. S2CID 124520395.
- Snapper, E. (1951). "Completely Primary Rings. III. Imbedding and Isomorphism Theorems". Annals of Mathematics. 53 (2): 207–234. doi:10.2307/1969539. JSTOR 1969539.
- Snapper, E. (1952). "Completely Primary Rings: IV. Chain Conditions". Annals of Mathematics. 55 (1): 46–64. doi:10.2307/1969419. JSTOR 1969419.
- Snapper, E. (1956). "Higher-dimensional field theory. I. The integral closure of a module" (PDF). Compositio Math. 13: 1–15. MR 0083172.
- Snapper, Ernst (1959). "Multiples of Divisors". Journal of Mathematics and Mechanics. 8 (6): 967–992. JSTOR 24900666.
- Snapper, Ernst (1960). "Polynomials Associated with Divisors". Journal of Mathematics and Mechanics. 9 (1): 123–139. JSTOR 24900514.
- Snapper, Ernst (1964). "Cohomology of Permutation Representations1 I. Spectral Sequences". Journal of Mathematics and Mechanics. 13 (1): 133–161. JSTOR 24901188.
- Snapper, Ernst (1964). "Cohomology of Permutation Representations: II. Cup Product". Journal of Mathematics and Mechanics. 13 (6): 1047–1064. JSTOR 24901252.
- Snapper, Ernst (1965). "Spectral Sequences and Frobenius Groups". Transactions of the American Mathematical Society. 114 (1): 133–146. doi:10.2307/1993992. JSTOR 1993992.
- Snapper, Ernst (1965). "Inflation and deflation for all dimensions". Pacific Journal of Mathematics. 15 (3): 1061–1081. doi:10.2140/pjm.1965.15.1061.
- Rudvalis, A.; Snapper, E. (1971). "Numerical polynomials for arbitrary characters". Journal of Combinatorial Theory, Series A. 10 (2): 145–159. doi:10.1016/0097-3165(71)90018-5.
- Snapper, Ernst (1979). "What is Mathematics?". The American Mathematical Monthly. 86 (7): 551–557. doi:10.1080/00029890.1979.11994852.
- Snapper, Ernst (1981). "An Affine Generalization of the Euler Line". The American Mathematical Monthly. 88 (3): 196–198. doi:10.1080/00029890.1981.11995225.

=== Books ===
- Snapper, E. (1959). Cohomology Theory and Algebraic Correspondences. Memoirs of the American Mathematical Society, Number 33. American Mathematical Soc. ISBN 0-8218-1233-5.
- Snapper, Ernst; Troyer, Robert J. (10 May 2014). Metric Affine Geometry. Academic Press. ISBN 9781483269337. (reprint of 1971 original)
