= John Knott (metallurgist) =

British metallurgist and academic (1938–2017)

John Knott OBE FRS FREng FIMMM FIMechE

Professor of Metallurgy and Materials, University of Birmingham
- In office 1990–2017

Personal details
- Born: John Frederick Knott; 9 December 1938
- Died: 5 October 2017 (aged 78)

John Frederick Knott (9 December 1938 – 5 October 2017) was an English metallurgist and materials scientist.

From 1962 to 1966, Knott was a Research Officer at the Central Electricity Research Laboratories in Leatherhead in Surrey, after which he became a lecturer in the Department of Materials, Science and Metallurgy at Cambridge University between 1967 and 1981. In 1990, he moved to the University of Birmingham, where he was Professor and Head of the School of Metallurgy and Materials until 1996, Dean of Engineering from 1995 to 1998 and the fifth Feeney Professor of Physical Metallurgy between 1994 and 2007.

He was elected a Fellow of the Royal Society (FRS) in 1990 and was awarded their Leverhulme Medal in 2005 "for his distinguished contributions to the quantitative scientific understanding of fracture processes in metals and alloys and its engineering applications". He was elected in 1988 as a Fellow of the Royal Academy of Engineering.

He died on 5 October 2017 at the age of 78.
