= Anne Neville (engineer) =

British academic (1970–2022)

Anne Neville OBE FRS FRSE FREng FIMechE
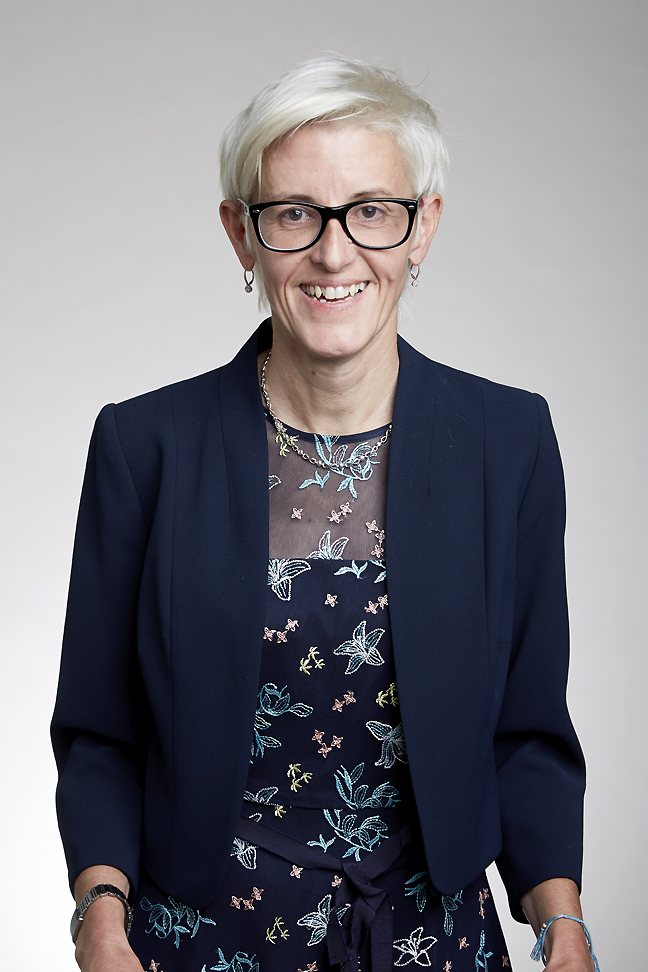
- Neville in 2016
- Born: 21 March 1970; Dumfries, Scotland
- Died: 2 July 2022 (aged 52); Linton, West Yorkshire, England
- Education: University of Glasgow (BEng, PhD)
- Awards: Order of the British Empire (2017); Leverhulme Medal (2016); James Clayton Prize (2016); Clifford Paterson Medal (2022); Suffrage Science award (2015); Royal Society Wolfson Research Merit Award (2013)
- Scientific career
- Fields: Corrosion; Tribocorrosion; Lubrication and wear; Mineral scaling; Surgical technology
- Workplaces: University of Leeds; Heriot-Watt University
- Thesis: An investigation of the corrosion behaviour of a range of engineering materials in marine environments (1995)
- Doctoral advisor: Trevor Hodgkiess
- Website: engineering.leeds.ac.uk/staff/230/Professor_Anne_Neville

Anne Neville (21 March 1970 – 2 July 2022) was the Royal Academy of Engineering Chair in emerging technologies and Professor of Tribology and Surface Engineering at the University of Leeds.

== Early life and education ==
Anne Neville was born on 21 March 1970 in Dumfries, where she also grew up with her older sister Linda. Their mother Doris worked as a pharmacy technician and their father Bill was a process worker at ICI Dumfries. Her uncle is Professor Robert Black, Emeritus Professor of Scots Law at the University of Edinburgh. Anne attended Maxwellton High School where her interest in maths and physics grew. Anne was also a good badminton player and played the trumpet.

She was educated at Maxwelltown High School in Dumfries and was unsure what she should do at university, at one point considered becoming a social worker. She went into engineering by accident. The Glasgow University prospectus fell open at the page with a Rolls-Royce gas turbine picture and she thought it looked interesting. Anne Neville's maths teacher was a mechanical engineer and he inspired her to investigate further. After visiting the university open days, Anne Neville decided that she wanted to study engineering and rejected her earlier initial thoughts of either studying maths or physics.

Neville began her studies at the University of Glasgow in 1988 and she graduated in 1992 with a First Class Honours BEng degree followed by PhD in mechanical engineering in 1995. As part of her PhD, she conducted an experimental study of corrosion and tribocorrosion processes on high alloy stainless steels and Ni-alloys and her work led to an increased understanding of the synergies that exist between corrosion and wear processes.

== Career and research ==
Neville was a mechanical engineer with a specific interest in corrosion, tribology and processes that occur at engineering interfaces. She was appointed a lecturer at Heriot-Watt University immediately after her PhD and started to build a research team.

Her contributions were manifold, across lubrication and wear, mineral scaling and tribo-corrosion, with applications in diverse fields such as the oil and gas sector, wind energy and tribo-corrosion and surgical technologies. In particular, her group were the first to measure corrosion rates in-situ in hip joint simulators which made important contributions to the work associated with the controversies associated with metal-on-metal hip implants. In 2009 and 2013 Anne's work was used to guide the medical health authorities in the UK on what to do with a hip prostheses that had shown unacceptably high failure rates in patients. They used advanced microscopy x-ray spectroscopy to understand how surfaces are lubricated in industrial and medical components.

Neville's research team grew to 25 researchers in the following years during her time at Heriot Watt University and in 1999 she was promoted to Reader and then Professor in 2002.

Neville and her group moved to Leeds in 2003 where she founded and was the Director of the Institute of Functional Surfaces (iFS) which comprised 70 researchers. The institute had a £10 million funding portfolio that spanned many agencies and industrial sectors including medical, oil and gas and automotive.

Her research group was the first to measure corrosion rates in-situ in hip joint simulators. This was very important in the most recent controversies around metal-on-metal implants. Anne Neville's publications were numerous, widely relied upon, and she published nearly 700 peer-reviewed articles during her career, with more than 11,000 citations.

Neville retired from her Leeds chair in 2020, having been diagnosed with terminal cancer.

== Personal life ==
Anne Neville married Mark McKelvie in 1999 and their daughter Rachel was born in 2005.

=== Views ===
Neville believed that more women in engineering could be achieved by ensuring that at primary school level we have the same number of girls and boys engaging with technology.

"Male or female… go for it! You will have the time of your life. I can honestly say I love my job. As an academic in engineering I can do what I want in terms of research as long as I can raise the funds to pay for it. This is a real privilege. I have travelled the world, met some brilliant people and have had great fun. What else could you ask for in a job?"

=== Health and death ===
Neville was first diagnosed with cancer in 2008. She died at her home in Linton, West Yorkshire, on 2 July 2022, aged 52.

== Awards and honours ==
Neville was the first woman to win the Royal Society of Edinburgh's 150 year old Makdougall Brisbane prize in 1999 and was an Engineering and Physical Sciences Research Council (EPSRC) Advanced Fellow from 1999 to 2004, elected a Fellow of the Institution of Mechanical Engineers (FIMechE) in 2007, elected a Fellow of the Royal Society of Edinburgh (FRSE) in 2005, elected a Fellow of the Institute of Materials, Minerals and Mining in 2009 and a Fellow of the Royal Academy of Engineering (FREng) in 2010.

She was awarded Institution of Mechanical Engineers Donald Julius Green prize in 2010, a Royal Society Wolfson Research Merit Award in 2011, the Donald Julius Groen Prize for Tribology in 2012, the 2014 STLE Wilbert Shultz Prize, Royal Society Wolfson Research MERIT Award in 2013 and was selected as an EPSRC RISE Fellow in 2014 which was an honour bestowed on the best established and future leaders in engineering and physical sciences. In 2015, Neville was awarded an Engineering and Physical Sciences Suffrage Science award. She was the first woman to be awarded the Institute of Mechanical Engineers' James Clayton Prize and she was also the first woman to win the Royal Society's Leverhulme Medal in 2016 for "revealing diverse physical and chemical processes at interacting interfaces, emphasising significant synergy between tribology and corrosion.”

Neville was appointed OBE in the 2017 New Year Honours for services to engineering. She was elected a Fellow of the Royal Society (FRS) in 2017.

She received the following honorary degrees:

- DEng, Heriot Watt University, 2017
- DEng, University of Glasgow, 2019

Neville was awarded the Royal Society's Clifford Patterson Medal in 2022.

She was posthumously inducted into the Scottish Engineering Hall of Fame in October 2022.

Her name is one of those featured on the sculpture Ribbons, unveiled in 2024.
