= Leverhulme Medal (Royal Society) =

Medal awarded by the Royal Society

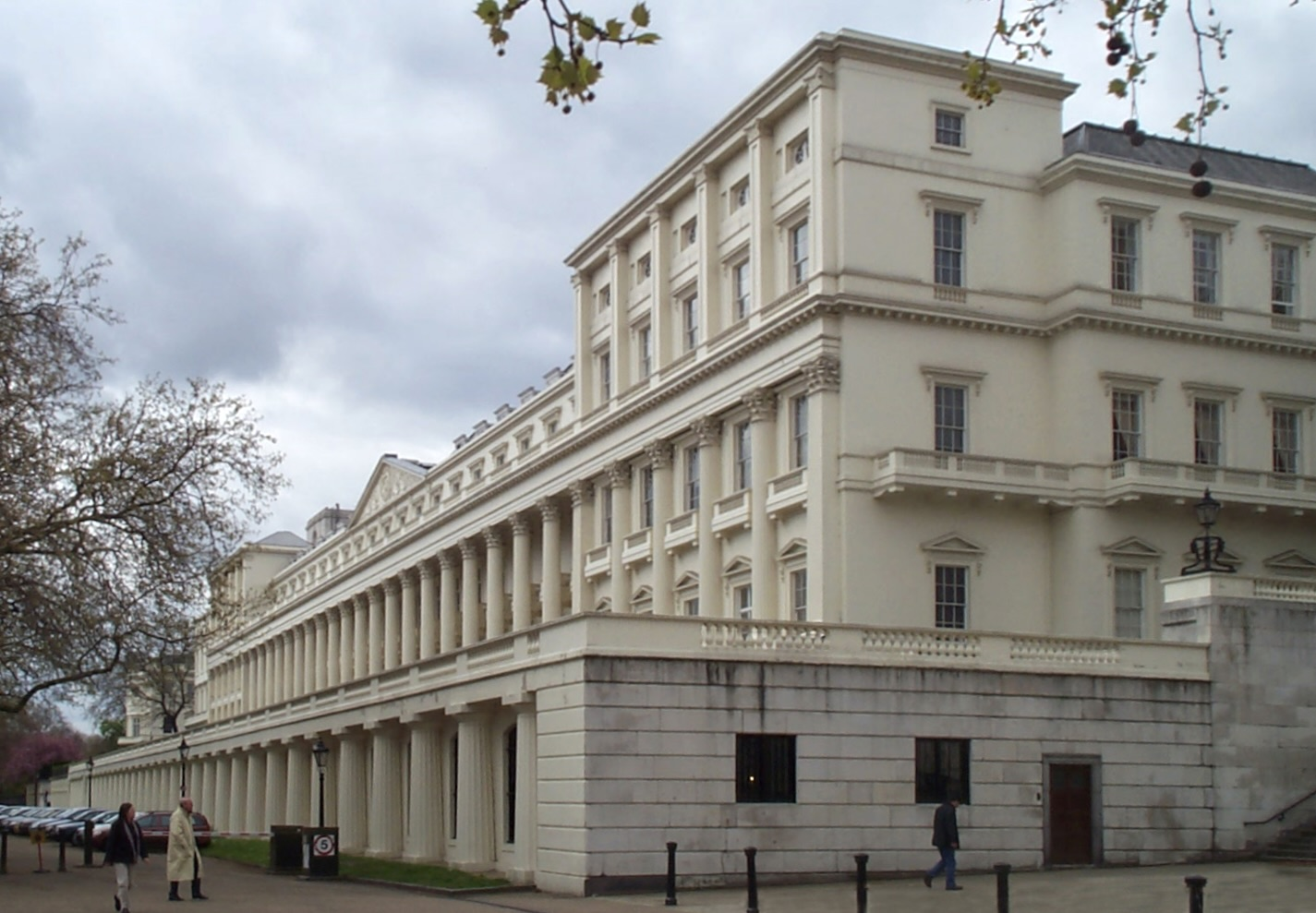
The premises of the Royal Society, which awards the medal

The Leverhulme Medal is awarded by the Royal Society every three years "for an outstandingly significant contribution in the field of pure or applied chemistry or engineering, including chemical engineering". It was created in 1960 after a donation by the Leverhulme Trust to mark the 300th anniversary of the foundation of the Royal Society, and is accompanied by a £2000 gift. Since its creation, it has been awarded 21 times, and unlike other Royal Society medals such as the Royal Medal, it has never been awarded to the same person multiple times. Citizens of the United Kingdom have won the medal 19 of the 21 times; the two foreign recipients have been Man Mohan Sharma, an Indian citizen who was awarded the medal in 1996 "for his work on the dynamics of multi-phase chemical reactions in industrial processes", and Frank Caruso, an Australian chemical engineer, awarded the medal in 2019. Two Leverhulme Medal winners have also won the Nobel Prize in Chemistry: Archer John Porter Martin, who won the medal in 1963 for "his distinguished and fundamental discoveries in chromatography and its application" and the Nobel Prize in 1952, and Cyril Norman Hinshelwood, who won the medal in 1960 for "his outstanding contributions to physical chemistry" and the Nobel Prize in 1956. Anne Neville became the first woman to receive the award in 2016.

== List of recipients ==
Year	Name	Rationale	Notes
1960	Cyril Norman Hinshelwood	"for his outstanding contributions to physical chemistry"	
1963	Archer John Porter Martin	"for his distinguished and fundamental discoveries in chromatography and its application"	
1966	Alec Issigonis	"for his distinguished contributions to the design of motor cars, particularly the Morris Minor and Austin and Morris Mini"	
1969	Hans Kronberger	"for his many distinguished contributions to nuclear reactor research and development and for outstanding leadership in all branches of his field"	—
1972	John Adams	"for his many distinguished work in development of particle accelerators, and plasma physics"	—
1975	Frank Rose	"for his distinguished contributions to the application of chemical science to industry"	—
1978	Frederick Warner	"for his outstanding work as consulting engineer both nationally and internationally in many branches of chemical engineering, particularly control of pollution"	
1981	Stanley Hooker	"for his work on superchargers of the Merlin engines, the development of the first Rolls-Royce jet engines, then Bristol engines including that for the jump jet and, later, the final development of the Rolls-Royce RB211 engine"	—
1984	John Frank Davidson	"for his distinguished contributions to chemical engineering, in particular the use of fluidised beds."	—
1987	George William Gray	"for his many contributions to the technologically important field of liquid crystals"	
1990	Ray Freeman	"for introducing new techniques in high resolution nuclear magnetic resonance spectroscopy, particularly the development of two-dimensional Fourier transform methods"	
1993	John Rowlinson	"distinguished for his contributions to thermodynamics, in particular to an understanding of the physical chemistry of gas–liquid interfaces and surfaces"	
1996	Man Mohan Sharma	"for his work on the dynamics of multi-phase chemical reactions in industrial processes"	
1999	Jack Baldwin	"in recognition of his distinguished contributions to the field of organic chemistry including his work on natural products synthesis and biosynthesis, particularly for his research in the b-lactam antibiotic field, initially contributing to biosynthetic problems which paved the way to the study of the enzymology of the process and eventually culminating in the determination of the crystal structure of isopenicillin N synthase"	
2002	Nicholas Handy	"for his pioneering contributions to the development of the modern methodology of quantum chemistry, which has had an enormous impact on chemistry and molecular biology"	
2005	John Knott	"for his distinguished contributions to the quantitative scientific understanding of fracture processes in metals and alloys and its engineering applications"	
2008	Anthony Cheetham	"for the discovery and characterisation of novel materials exhibiting potential for catalysis and storage"	
2010	Martyn Poliakoff	"for his outstanding contributions in the fields of Green Chemistry and supercritical fluids by the application of chemistry to advance chemical engineering processes"	
2013	Konstantin Novoselov	"for revolutionary work on graphene, other two‐dimensional crystals and their heterostructures that has great potential for a number of applications, from electronics to energy."	
2016	Anne Neville	"for revealing diverse physical and chemical processes at interacting interfaces, emphasising significant synergy between tribology and corrosion and in addition for exceptional research which has enhanced understanding of basic processes and addressed major industrial problems."	
2019	Frank Caruso	"for driving the application of engineered particles in biology and medicine through nanoscale materials engineering"	
2022	Charlotte Williams	"for her pioneering work developing and understanding high performance carbon dioxide utilization catalysts and implementable processes"	
2025	Michael M. Thackeray	"for contributions to the development of the lithium-ion battery, particularly for his invention of the NMC cathode, the dominant lithium-ion battery technology"	
