= John McInnis =

John McInnis may refer to:

- John McInnis (Alberta politician) (1950–2003), politician in Alberta, Canada
- John McInnis (British Columbia politician) (ca 1882–1972), politician in British Columbia, Canada
- John McInnis Jr. Secondary School

== See also ==
- John McInnes (disambiguation)
