= Frank Caruso (chemical engineer) =

Australian chemical engineer (born 1968)

Frank Caruso FAA FTSE FRS
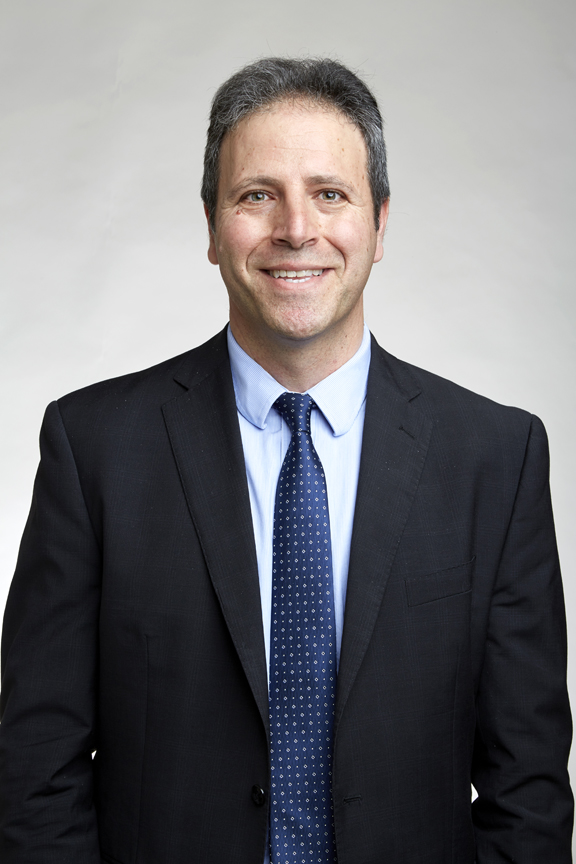
- Caruso in 2018
- Born: 1 January 1968 (age 58)
- Education: University of Melbourne
- Awards: German BMBF BioFuture Award (1999); Le Fèvre Memorial Prize (Australian Academy of Science) (2005); ACS Nano Lectureship (Asia/Pacific) Award (Inaugural) (2012); Eureka Prize (2013); The Batteard–Jordan Australian Polymer Medal (Royal Australian Chemical Institute) (2018); Leverhulme Medal (Royal Society) (2019); Honorary Doctorate (University of Copenhagen) (2026)
- Scientific career
- Fields: Materials science Bioengineering; Nanotechnology; Polymer science
- Workplaces: University of Melbourne; Max Planck Institute of Colloids and Interfaces
- Thesis: Lateral diffusion of amphiphiles in air-water monolayers and Langmuir-Blodgett films (1993)
- Doctoral advisor: Franz Grieser; Peter Thistlethwaite
- Other academic advisors: Helmuth Möhwald
- Website: chemical.eng.unimelb.edu.au/nano

Francesco Caruso (born 1 January 1968) is an Australian chemical engineer who is Melbourne Laureate Professor and a National Health and Medical Research Council (NHMRC) Leadership Fellow in the School of Chemical and Biomolecular Engineering at the University of Melbourne, Australia. Caruso was Deputy Director of the Australian Research Council (ARC) Centre of Excellence in Convergent Bio-Nanoscience and Technology (2014–2021).

== Education ==
Caruso received his PhD in 1994 from the University of Melbourne for research on lateral diffusion of amphiphiles in air-water monolayers and Langmuir–Blodgett films.

== Career and research ==
Caruso conducted postdoctoral research at the Commonwealth Scientific and Industrial Research Organisation (CSIRO) Division of Chemicals and Polymers. From 1997 to 2002, he was an Alexander von Humboldt Foundation Research Fellow with Helmuth Möhwald and group leader at the Max Planck Institute of Colloids and Interfaces in Berlin. Since 2003, he has been a professor at the University of Melbourne and has held two ARC Federation Fellowships (2002–2007 and 2007–2012), an ARC Australian Laureate Fellowship (2012–2017), an NHMRC Senior Principal Research Fellowship (2018–2022), and an NHMRC Leadership Fellowship (2023–2027). He is an elected Fellow of the Australian Academy of Science (FAA) (2009), the Royal Society, UK (FRS) (2018), and the Australian Academy of Technological Sciences and Engineering (FTSE) (2024), and was awarded the Eureka Prize for Leadership in Science by CSIRO in 2013.

Caruso has published over 600 peer-reviewed papers and was on Clarivate Analytics' 2018 list of Highly Cited Researchers and Thomson Reuters’ 2014 list of World's Most Influential Scientific Minds. He is an executive editor of American Chemical Society (ACS) Chemistry of Materials and is on the editorial advisory board of ten other scientific journals.

His work on thin films includes the discovery of metal-phenolic networks in his lab by Prof. Hirotaka Ejima and Dr. Joseph J. Richardson.
