= Simon Rushton =

Simon Rushton is a British academic who has written on global health with a particular focus on international responses to HIV/AIDS, the links between health and security, the changing architecture of global health governance, and issues surrounding conflict and health. He is an Associate Fellow of the Centre on Global Health Security at Chatham House.

From 2009 to 2017 he was co-editor (with Alan Ingram and Maria Kett at UCL) of the quarterly journal Medicine, Conflict and Survival.

== Publications ==
Books

- Simon Rushton and Owain David Williams (eds.) Partnerships and Foundations in Global Health Governance, Palgrave Macmillan, 2011.

Journal articles

- Colin McInnes and Simon Rushton, 'HIV, AIDS and security: where are we now?', International Affairs, Vol. 86, No. 1 (January 2010).
- Simon Rushton, 'AIDS and international security in the United Nations System', Health Policy and Planning, Vol. 25, No. 6 (November 2010).
- Simon Rushton, 'Framing AIDS: Securitization, Development-ization, Rights-ization', Global Health Governance, Vol. 4, No. 1 (Fall 2010).
- Simon Rushton, 'The UN Secretary-General and norm entrepreneurship: Boutros Boutros-Ghali and democracy promotion', Global Governance, Vol. 4, No. 1 (Jan-March 2008).
- Colin McInnes and Simon Rushton, 'The UK, health and peace-building: the mysterious disappearance of Health as a Bridge for Peace', Medicine, Conflict & Survival, Vol. 22, No. 2 (April–June 2006).
- Colin McInnes, Simon Rushton and Owain David Williams, 'HIV/AIDS: National Security, Human Security', Human Security Bulletin (March 2006)
- Simon Rushton, 'Health and Post-Conflict Peacebuilding: Resuscitating the Failed State in Sierra Leone', International Relations, Vol. 19, No. 4 (December 2005).

Book chapters

- Owain David Williams and Simon Rushton, 'The end of one era and the start of another: Partnerships, foundations and the shifting political economy of public health', in Rushton and Williams (eds.), Partnerships and Foundations in Global Health Governance, Palgrave Macmillan, 2011.
- Owain David Williams and Simon Rushton, 'Private actors in global health governance', in Rushton and Williams (eds.), Partnerships and Foundations in Global Health Governance, Palgrave Macmillan, 2011.
- Simon Rushton, 'Global governance capacities in health: WHO and infectious disease', in Kay and Williams (eds.), Global Health Governance: Crisis, Institutions and Political Economy, Palgrave Macmillan, 2009.
- Alan Ingram and Simon Rushton, 'Health and Security', in Global Health Watch 2, London: Zed Books, 2008.
- Simon Rushton, 'A History of Peace through Health' in Neil Arya & Joanna Santa-Barbara (eds.), Peace through Health: How Health Professionals Can Work for a Less Violent World, Bloomfield, CT: Kumarian Press, 2008.
