= MacInnes =

MacInnes is a surname. The name is derived from the Gaelic mac Aonghais. Notable people with the surname include:

- Alan MacInnes, Canadian judge
- Alexander Stewart MacInnes (fl. first half of the 20th century), Scottish clergyman
- Angus MacInnes (1947–2024), Canadian actor
- Campbell MacInnes (1901–1977), Anglican bishop
- Catriona MacInnes, Scottish film-maker
- Colin MacInnes (1914–1976), English novelist and journalist
- Donald MacInnes (1824–1900), Canadian businessman and politician
- Duncan MacInnes (1897–1970), Anglican bishop
- Duncan A. MacInnes (1885–1965), American chemist
- Duncan Sayre MacInnes (1860–1918), Canadian soldier and engineer
- Gordon MacInnes, American politician
- Hamish MacInnes (1930–2020), Scottish mountaineer
- Helen MacInnes (1907–1985), Scottish-American author
- Iain MacInnes, Scottish folk musician
- John MacInnes (ice hockey) (1925–1983), Canadian ice hockey player and coach
- Maggie MacInnes (born 1963), Scottish folk singer
- Mairi MacInnes (poet) (1925–2017), English poet
- Màiri MacInnes (singer), Scottish Gaelic singer
- Martin MacInnes (born 1983), Scottish writer
- Miles MacInnes (1830–1909), British landowner, railway director and Liberal Party politician
- Kathleen MacInnes (born 1969), Scottish singer, television presenter and actress
- Rennie MacInnes (1870–1931), Anglican bishop
- Tom MacInnes (1867–1951), Canadian poet and writer

== See also ==
- Clan MacInnes
- McInnes
- MacInnis
