= Malcolm Macdonald (engineer) =

Scottish space technology engineer and academic

Eur Ing Prof Malcolm Macdonald C.Eng. FRAeS FRSA FRSE FREng
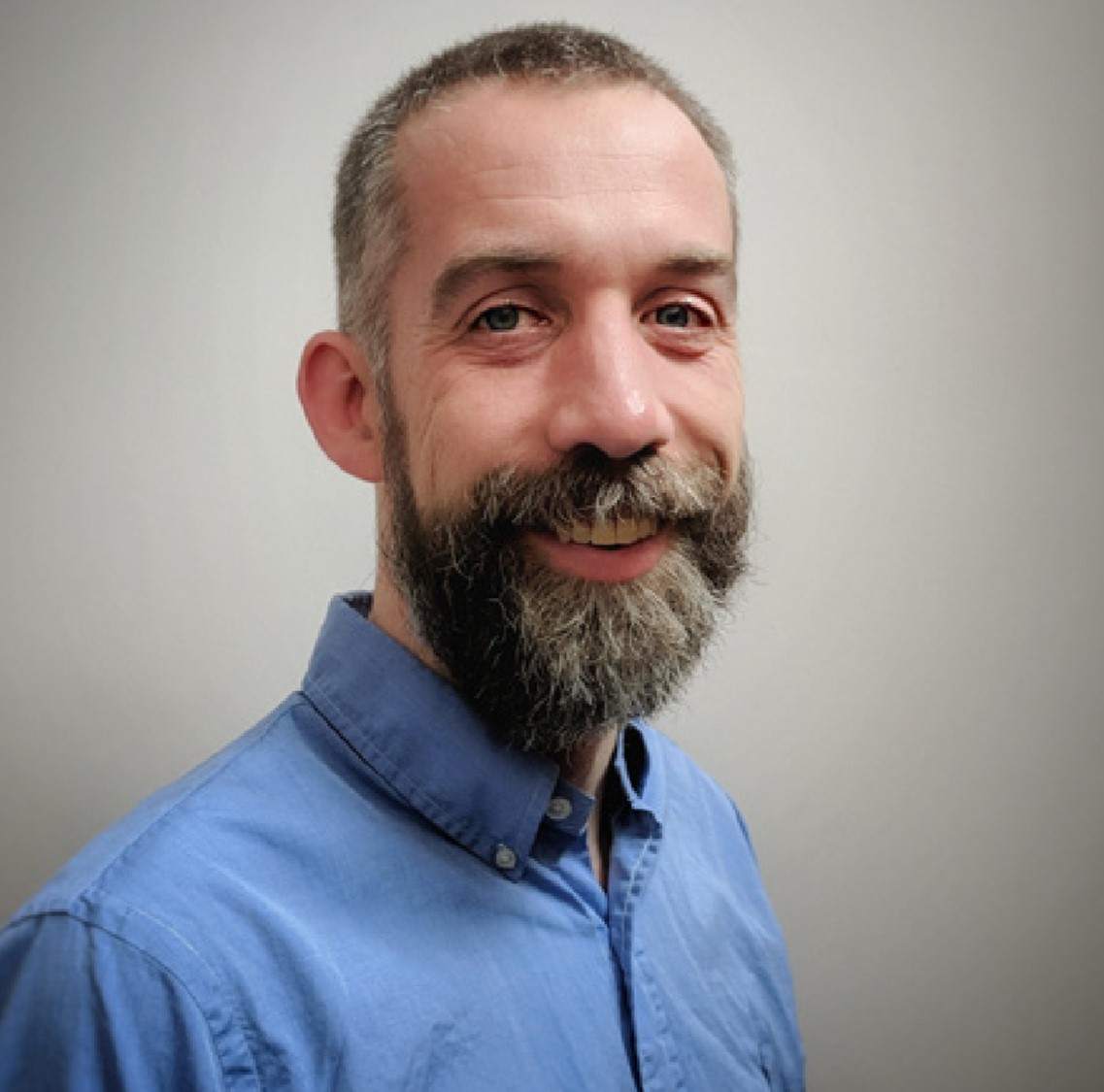
- Malcolm Macdonald, July 2018
- Born: 1978, Bellshill, Scotland
- Education: University of Glasgow (B. Eng. (Hons) and PhD)
- Known for: Space technology Astrodynamics; Network science Solar sailing
- Awards: Fellow of the Royal Academy of Engineering (2023); Fellow of the Royal Society of Arts (2021); Fellow of the Royal Society of Edinburgh (2021); Fellow of the Royal Aeronautical Society (2013); Royal Society of Edinburgh Makdougall Brisbane Prize (2016); European Engineer (2008); Chartered Engineer (2008)
- Scientific career
- Fields: Space technology, aerospace engineering
- Workplaces: University of Strathclyde; UK Space Agency Steering Board; SCISYS; University of Glasgow
- Thesis: Analytical methodologies for solar trail trajectory design (2005)
- Website: spaceprof.xyz

Malcolm Macdonald FRAeS FRSA FRSE FREng is a Scottish space technology engineer, academic, and director. He is a Professor and the Chair of Applied Space Technology at the University of Strathclyde, President of the Royal Aeronautical Society, and a visiting professor at University College Dublin. He was Director of the Scottish Centre of Excellence in Satellite Applications, SoXSA, from 2014–2020, and a non-executive member of the UK Space Agency Steering Board from 2017–2020. He is an acknowledged expert in space research, and has been described in the media as "Scotland's leading space expert".

== Education ==
Malcolm Macdonald studied at University of Glasgow, graduating with a first in Aerospace engineering in 2000. He completed his doctoral research in Astrodynamics at University of Glasgow from then until the end of 2002, graduating in 2005, where he studied with Colin R. McInnes.

== Career and research ==
After completing his doctoral research Macdonald continued to work with Colin R. McInnes as his Research Assistant until the end of 2004. In 2005 Macdonald joined SCISYS where he worked on projects including LISA Pathfinder and ADM-Aeolus, prior to joining the University of Strathclyde in 2008.

Macdonald describes himself as "a professional space technology engineer, working in academia". His research is in space technology, including small satellites and solar sails, as well as astrodynamics, and network science. He was awarded the 2016 Royal Society of Edinburgh Sir Makdougall Brisbane Medal, for "outstanding research work in the development and application of space mission systems to challenge conventional ideas and advance new concepts in the exploration and exploitation of space." He was elected a fellow of the Royal Society of Edinburgh in 2021.

Macdonald was the only non-US member of a National Academies of Sciences, Engineering, and Medicine's committee on Achieving Science Goals with CubeSats, and a member of the Committee on Space Research (COSPAR) Study Group on Small Satellites for Space Sciences. He was also a member of International Academy of Astronautics study group 4.23 on Post-Mission Disposal for Micro and Smaller Satellites: Concepts and Trade Studies.

Macdonald has been an associate editor of the American Institute of Aeronautics and Astronautics (AIAA) Journal of Guidance, Control, and Dynamics since 2009, and led the development of The International Handbook of Space Technology, as well as contributing several chapters. This Handbook has sixty contributing authors, including high-profile contributors from Japan, Europe, and the US, including a foreword by Elon Musk.

Macdonald is also involved in the commercialisation of space through his role as the director of the Scottish Centre of Excellence in Satellite Applications, which supports the application of space data and services as well as the development of technology that enables this data and services. He also founded the Data.Space conference, which was held annually in Glasgow, and attracted c-suite speakers and thought leaders from across the world.

== Outreach and media ==
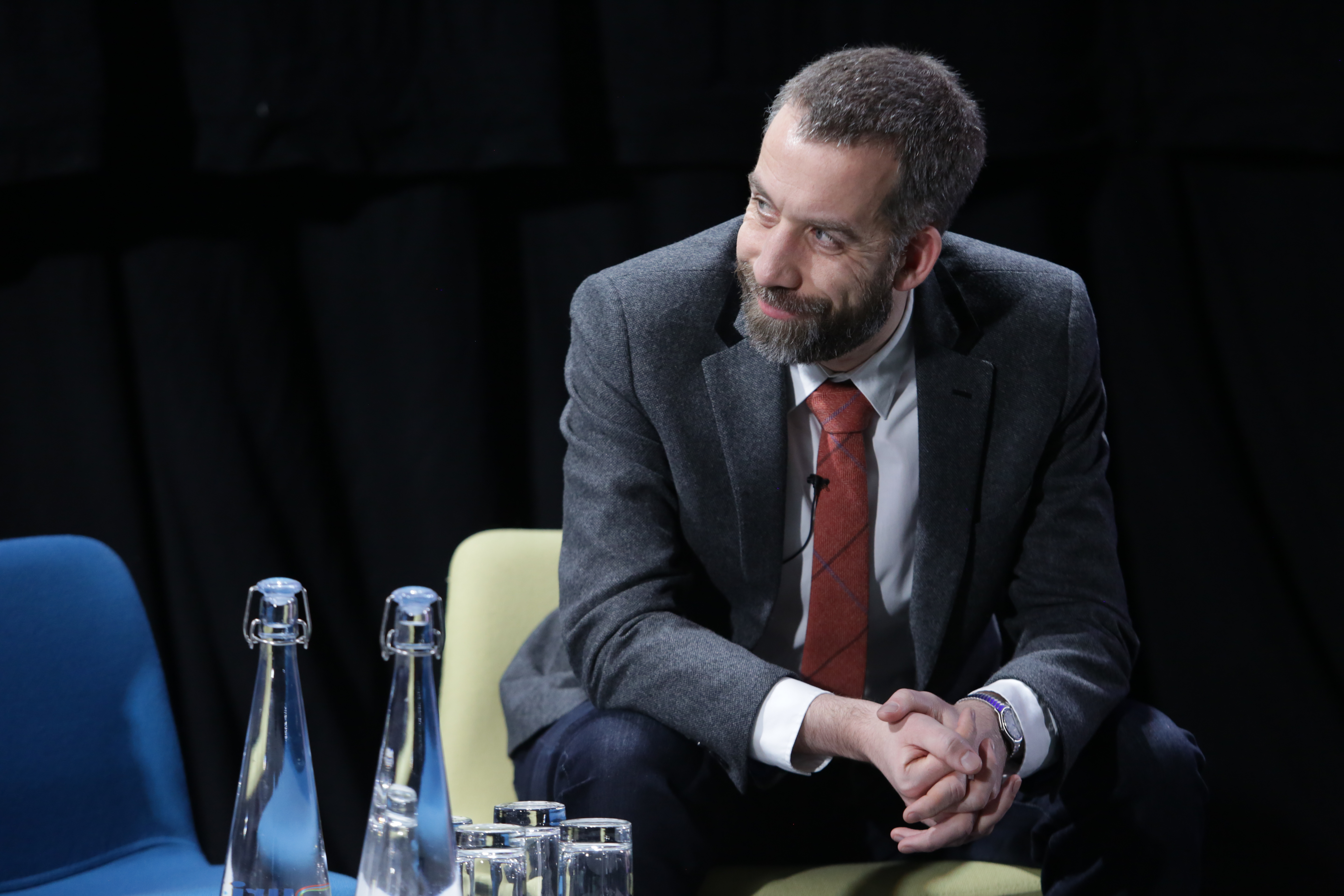
Malcolm Macdonald at the DATA.SPACE2017 conference in Glasgow, Scotland

Macdonald is frequently quoted by national and international media on topics relating to the space industry, and is a regular contributor to BBC Radio and Television, including BBC Radio Scotland shows such as Good Morning Scotland and Drive Time, as well as appearing on television shows such as the BBC Daily Politics Show and STV's Scotland Tonight.

Macdonald is also the co-creator and co-producer of a science quiz show, New Peers Review, which is broadcast on Deutsche Welle's Spectrum radio show.

He also regularly delivers talks to branches of learned societies, such as the Royal Aeronautical Society and the Institute of Physics, as well as to local science, engineering, and astronomy clubs. He has also worked with the BBC to broaden understanding of issues related to space, such as the re-entry of Tiangong-1, with CBeebies programme Nina and the Neurons for the episode Earth Explorers, and with BBC Radio Scotland to put a Red Nose into near-space for Comic Relief in 2013.

== Awards and honours ==
Recognition of his engineering achievements includes:

- 2025 President-elect, and Trustee, of the Royal Aeronautical Society
- 2023 Fellowship of the Royal Academy of Engineering (FREng)
- 2021 Fellowship of the Royal Society of Arts (FRSA)
- 2021 Knowledge Exchange Champion of the Year, Scottish Knowledge Exchange Awards.
- 2021 Fellowship of the Royal Society of Edinburgh (FRSE)
- 2016 Royal Society of Edinburgh Sir Makdougall Brisbane Medal
- 2013 Fellowship of the Royal Aeronautical Society (FRAeS)
- 2013 Elected member Royal Society of Edinburgh Young Academy of Scotland, five-year term.
- 2012 Best Scottish Knowledge Transfer Partnership Award, with AAC Clyde Space.
- 2011 Sir Arthur C. Clarke Award for Space Research Achievement, awarded to the Advanced Space Concepts Laboratory
- 2010 Times Higher Education, Outstanding Engineering Research Team of the Year shortlist nomination.
- 2009 Associate Fellow of the American Institute of Aeronautics and Astronautics
- 2008 Registered European Engineer with the European Federation of National Engineering Associations.
- 2008 Engineering Council UK Chartered Engineer (UK). Registration No. 571998.
- 2003 Ackroyd Stuart Propulsion Prize (2003) awarded by the Royal Aeronautical Society

== Bibliography ==
- The International Handbook of Space Technology Editors: Macdonald, Malcolm, Badescu, Viorel (Eds.), Springer-Verlag Berlin Heidelberg, 2014, ISBN 978-3-642-41100-7, doi:10.1007/978-3-642-41101-4
- Advances in Solar Sailing Editor: Macdonald, Malcolm (Eds.), Springer-Verlag Berlin Heidelberg, 2014, ISBN 978-3-642-34906-5, doi:10.1007/978-3-642-34907-2
- Macdonald, Malcolm, Smith, Lesley Jane, Impact Assessment of Scottish Independence on the Space Sector, University of Strathclyde publishing, 2014, ISBN 978-1-909522-04-6 University of Strathclyde publishing - Impact Assessment of Scottish Independence on the Space Sector
