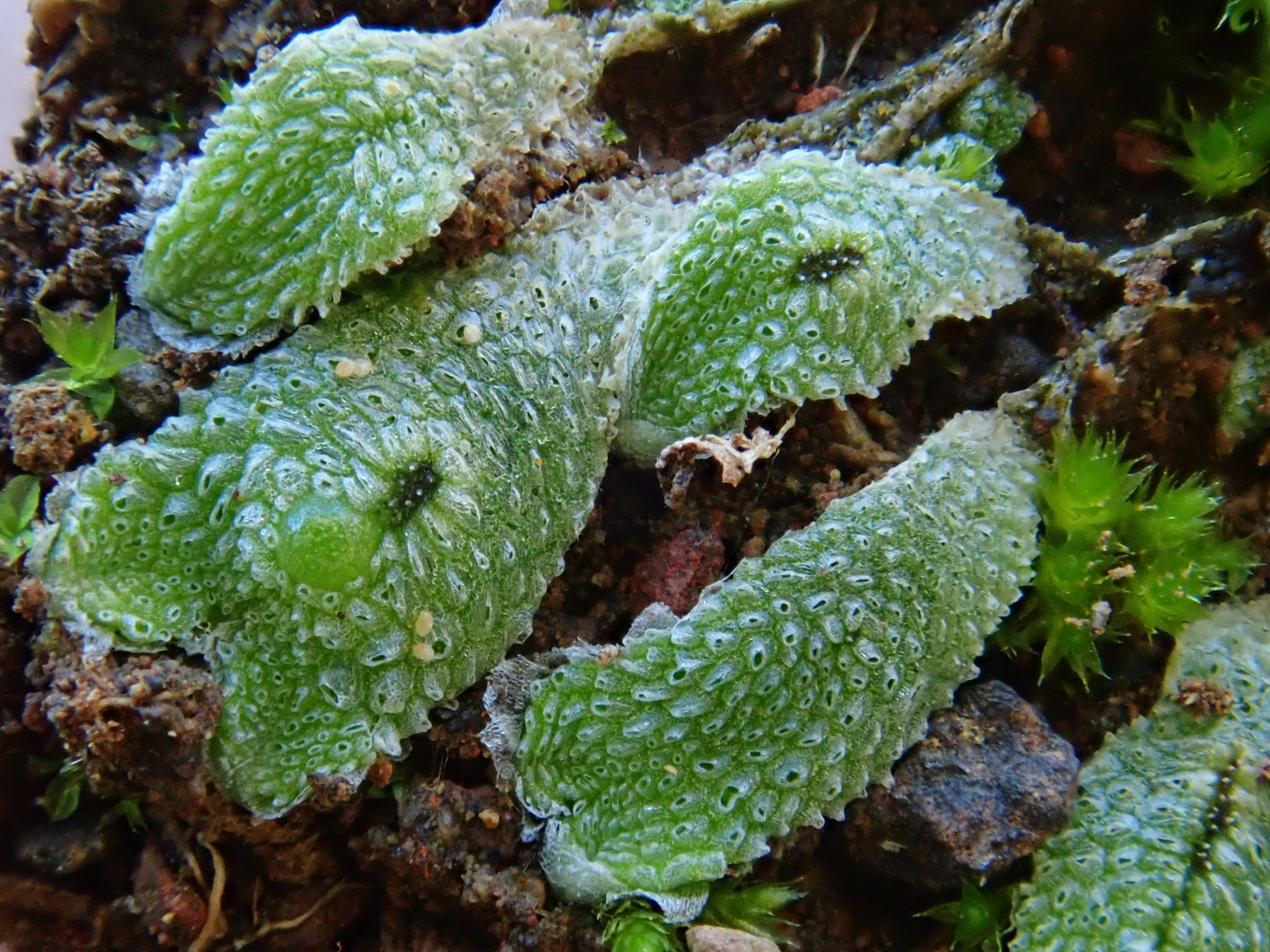
- Exormotheca pustulosa in Tenerife

Scientific classification
- Kingdom: Plantae
- Division: Marchantiophyta
- Class: Marchantiopsida
- Order: Marchantiales
- Family: Corsiniaceae
- Genus: Exormotheca; Mitt.

Type species
- Exormotheca pustulosa Mitt.

= Exormotheca =

Genus of liverworts

Exormotheca is a group of liverworts in the family Exormothecaceae. It was described as a genus in 1870.

Species

1. Exormotheca bischlerae Furuki & Higuchi - China
2. Exormotheca bulbigena Bornefeld, O.H. Volk & R. Wolf - Namibia
3. Exormotheca bullosa (Stephani) K. Müller - Portugal
4. Exormotheca ceylonensis Meijer - Sri Lanka
5. Exormotheca holstii Steph. - Namibia, South Africa
6. Exormotheca martins-loussaoae Sim-Sim, A.Martins, J.Patiño & C.A.Garcia - Cape Verde
7. Exormotheca pustulosa Mitt. - Oman, Yemen, Saudi Arabia, United Arab Emirates, St. Helena, Mexico, Tanzania, Canary Islands, Spain, France, Portugal
8. Exormotheca welwitschii Steph. - Algarve
