= Stephensoniella brevipedunculata =

Conservation status
- Endangered (IUCN 2.3)

Scientific classification
- Kingdom: Plantae
- Division: Marchantiophyta
- Class: Marchantiopsida
- Order: Marchantiales
- Family: Exormothecaceae
- Genus: Stephensoniella; Kashyap
- Species: S. brevipedunculata

Binomial name
- Stephensoniella brevipedunculata Kashyap

Species of liverwort

Stephensoniella brevipedunculata is a species of liverwort in the family Exormothecaceae. It is the only species in the genus Stephensoniella. It is confined to the Western Himalaya in Himachal Pradesh and Uttaranchal. It is threatened by habitat loss.

The genus name of Stephensoniella is in honour of John Stephenson (1871–1933), who was a surgeon and zoologist.
