= Joseph Wedderburn =

Scottish mathematician

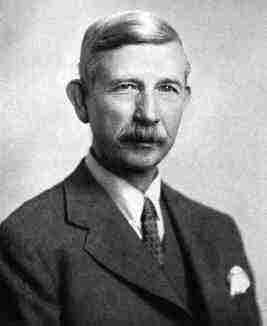
- Joseph Henry Maclagan Wedderburn (1882–1948)
- Born: 2 February 1882; Forfar, Angus, Scotland
- Died: 9 October 1948 (aged 66); Princeton, New Jersey, US
- Citizenship: American
- Education: University of Edinburgh
- Known for: Wedderburn-Etherington number Artin–Wedderburn theorem
- Awards: MacDougall-Brisbane Gold Medal, Fellow of the Royal Society
- Scientific career
- Fields: Mathematician
- Workplaces: Princeton University
- Doctoral advisor: George Chrystal
- Doctoral students: Merrill Flood; Nathan Jacobson; Ernst Snapper

Joseph Henry Maclagan Wedderburn FRSE FRS (2 February 1882 – 9 October 1948) was a Scottish mathematician, who taught at Princeton University for most of his career. A significant algebraist, he proved that a finite division algebra is a field (Wedderburn's little theorem), and part of the Artin–Wedderburn theorem on simple algebras. He also worked on group theory and matrix algebra.

His younger brother was the lawyer Ernest Wedderburn.

== Life ==
Joseph Wedderburn was the tenth of fourteen children of Alexander Wedderburn of Pearsie, a physician, and Anne Ogilvie. He was educated at Forfar Academy then in 1895 his parents sent Joseph and his younger brother Ernest to live in Edinburgh with their paternal uncle, J. R. Maclagan Wedderburn, allowing them to attend George Watson's College. This house was at 3 Glencairn Crescent in the West End of the city.

In 1898 Joseph entered the University of Edinburgh. In 1903, he published his first three papers, worked as an assistant in the Physical Laboratory of the University, obtained an MA degree with first class honours in mathematics, and was elected a Fellow of the Royal Society of Edinburgh, upon the proposal of George Chrystal, James Gordon MacGregor, Cargill Gilston Knott and William Peddie. Aged 21 on election he remains one of the youngest Fellows ever.

He then studied briefly at the University of Leipzig and the University of Berlin, where he met the algebraists Frobenius and Schur. A Carnegie Scholarship allowed him to spend the 1904–1905 academic year at the University of Chicago where he worked with Oswald Veblen, E. H. Moore, and most importantly, Leonard Dickson, who was to become the most important American algebraist of his day.

Returning to Scotland in 1905, Wedderburn worked for four years at the University of Edinburgh as an assistant to George Chrystal, who supervised his D.Sc, awarded in 1908 for a thesis titled On Hypercomplex Numbers. He gained a PhD in algebra from the University of Edinburgh in 1908. From 1906 to 1908, Wedderburn edited the Proceedings of the Edinburgh Mathematical Society. In 1909, he returned to the United States to become a Preceptor in Mathematics at Princeton University; his colleagues included Luther P. Eisenhart, Oswald Veblen, Gilbert Ames Bliss, and George Birkhoff.

Upon the outbreak of the First World War, Wedderburn enlisted in the British Army as a private. He was the first person at Princeton to volunteer for that war, and had the longest war service of anyone on the staff. He served with the Seaforth Highlanders in France, as Lieutenant (1914), then as Captain in the 10th (Reserve) Battalion (1915–18). While a Captain in the Fourth Field Survey Battalion of the Royal Engineers in France, he devised sound-ranging equipment to locate enemy artillery.

He returned to Princeton after the war, becoming Associate Professor in 1921 and editing the Annals of Mathematics until 1928. While at Princeton, he supervised only three PhDs, one of them being Nathan Jacobson. In his later years, Wedderburn became an increasingly solitary figure and may even have suffered from depression. His isolation after his 1945 early retirement was such that his death from a heart attack was not noticed for several days. His Nachlass was destroyed, as per his instructions.

Wedderburn received the MacDougall-Brisbane Gold Medal and Prize from the Royal Society of Edinburgh in 1921, and was elected to the Royal Society of London in 1933.

== Work ==
In all, Wedderburn published about 40 books and papers, making important advances in the theory of rings, algebras and matrix theory.

In 1905, Wedderburn published a paper that included three claimed proofs of a theorem stating that a noncommutative finite division ring could not exist. The proofs all made clever use of the interplay between the additive group of a finite division algebra A, and the multiplicative group A* = A-{0}. Parshall (1983) notes that the first of these three proofs had a gap not noticed at the time. Meanwhile, Wedderburn's Chicago colleague Dickson also found a proof of this result but, believing Wedderburn's first proof to be correct, Dickson acknowledged Wedderburn's priority. But Dickson also noted that Wedderburn constructed his second and third proofs only after having seen Dickson's proof. Parshall concludes that Dickson should be credited with the first correct proof.

This theorem yields insights into the structure of finite projective geometries. In their paper on "Non-Desarguesian and non-Pascalian geometries" in the 1907 Transactions of the American Mathematical Society, Wedderburn and Veblen showed that in these geometries, Pascal's theorem is a consequence of Desargues' theorem. They also constructed finite projective geometries which are neither "Desarguesian" nor "Pascalian" (the terminology is Hilbert's).

Wedderburn's best-known paper was his sole-authored "On hypercomplex numbers," published in the 1907 Proceedings of the London Mathematical Society, and for which he was awarded the D.Sc. the following year. This paper gives a complete classification of simple and semisimple algebras. He then showed that every finite-dimensional semisimple algebra can be constructed as a direct sum of simple algebras and that every simple algebra is isomorphic to a matrix algebra for some division ring. The Artin–Wedderburn theorem generalises these results to algebras with the descending chain condition.

His best known book is his Lectures on Matrices (1934), which Jacobson praised as follows:

That this was the result of a number of years of painstaking labour is evidenced by the bibliography of 661 items (in the revised printing) covering the period 1853 to 1936. The work is, however, not a compilation of the literature, but a synthesis that is Wedderburn's own. It contains a number of original contributions to the subject.

— Nathan Jacobson, quoted in Taylor 1949

About Wedderburn's teaching:

He was apparently a very shy man and much preferred looking at the blackboard to looking at the students. He had the galley proofs from his book "Lectures on Matrices" pasted to cardboard for durability, and his "lecturing" consisted of reading this out loud while simultaneously copying it onto the blackboard.

— Hooke, 1984

== See also ==
- Hypercomplex numbers
- Wedderburn–Etherington number
