= MacInnis =

MacInnis is a surname. Notable people with the surname include:

- Ai Hua (born Charlotte MacInnis in 1981), American television presenter active in China
- Al MacInnis (born 1963), Canadian hockey defenseman
- Alison MacInnis (born 1980), American actress
- Angus MacInnis (1884–1964), Canadian politician
- David Macinnis Gill (born 1963), American author
- Donald MacInnis (1918–2007), Canadian politician
- Gordon MacInnis (born 1945), Canadian businessman and politician
- Grace MacInnis (1905–1991), Canadian politician and feminist
- Joseph B. MacInnis (born 1937), Canadian explorer, the first scientist to dive under the North Pole
- Lloyd MacInnis (1917–1965), Canadian radio host and television presenter
- Malcolm MacInnis (1933–2023), Canadian politician
- William H. MacInnis (1861-?), American politician

== See also ==
- MacInnis Lake, a lake of Cape Breton Regional Municipality, Nova Scotia, Canada
- McInnes
- MacInnes
