= Arunas Rudvalis =

American mathematician (born 1945)

Arunas Rudvalis (born June 8, 1945) is an Emeritus Professor of Mathematics at the University of Massachusetts Amherst. He is best known for the Rudvalis group.

Rudvalis went to the Harvey Mudd College and received his Ph.D. degree in Dartmouth College under direction of Ernst Snapper.
