= Rothesay Academy =

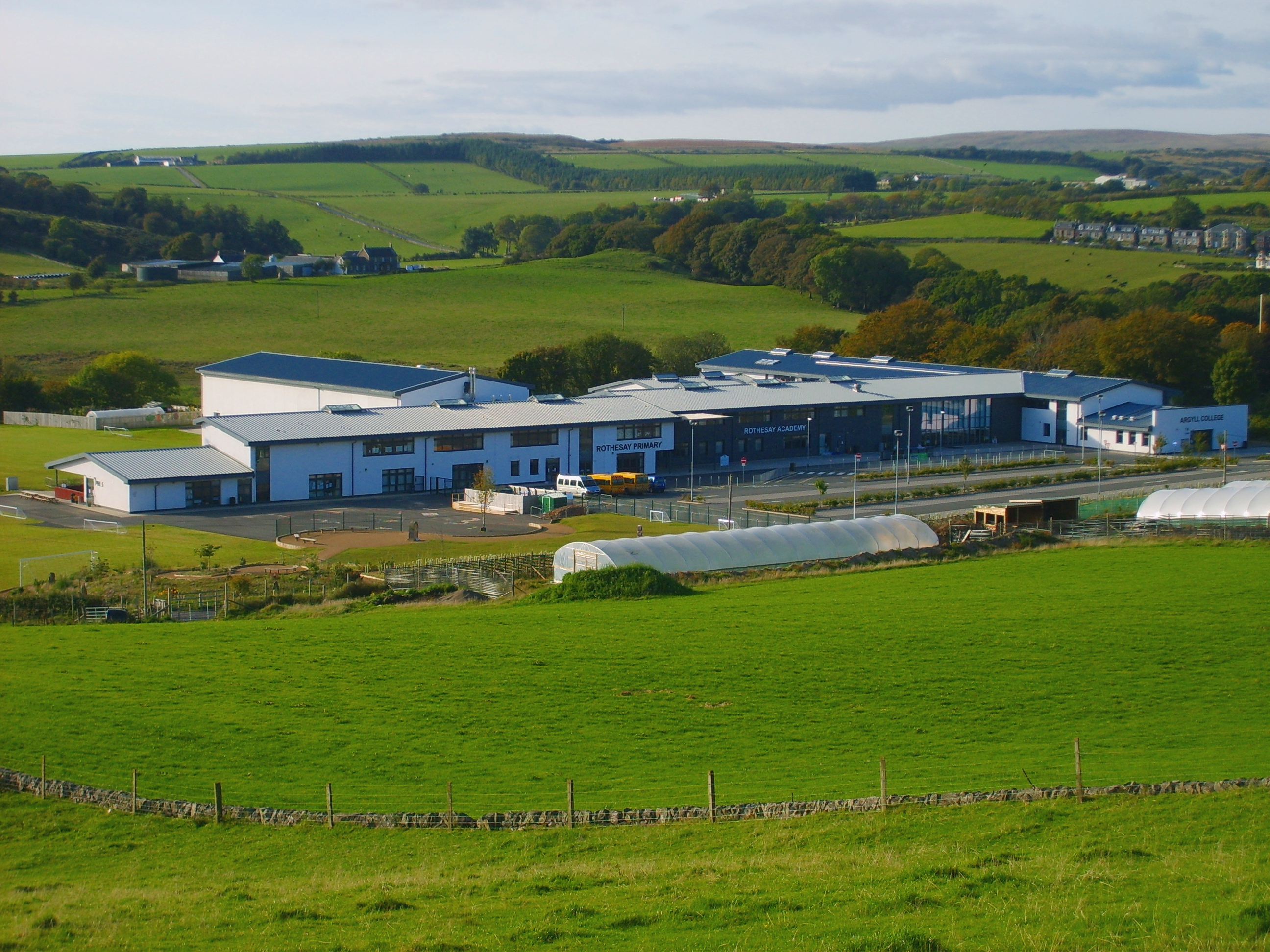
- Rothesay Joint Campus

Location
- High Street; Rothesay, Isle of Bute, PA20 9JH; Scotland
- Coordinates: 55.8256°N 5.0572°W

Information
- Type: Secondary school
- Established: 1870 (current location 2007)
- Local authority: Argyll and Bute Council
- Gender: Coeducational
- Age: 11 to 18
- Enrolment: 281 (approx)
- School years: S1-S6
- Website: https://www.rothesayacademy.argyll-bute.sch.uk/

Rothesay Academy is a secondary school in the town of Rothesay on the Isle of Bute.

== Feeder schools ==
Rothesay Academy has 3 associated primary schools: Rothesay Primary School and St. Andrew's Primary in Rothesay and North Bute Primary in Port Bannatyne.

== History ==
The school as an institution first opened in 1870, replacing the earlier Croft Lodge and a church school. The original Victorian building, overlooking Rothesay Bay, was extended and modernised in 1910 and again in 1938. It burned to the ground in 1954 and was replaced by a building of contemporary architecture, which opened in 1959. The present building at Townhead dates from 2007, on a joint campus site with Rothesay Primary School and Argyll College. It is one of a batch of joint campuses constructed around the west of Scotland from 2005 to 2009.
