= Kelley Lee =

Canadian global health educator

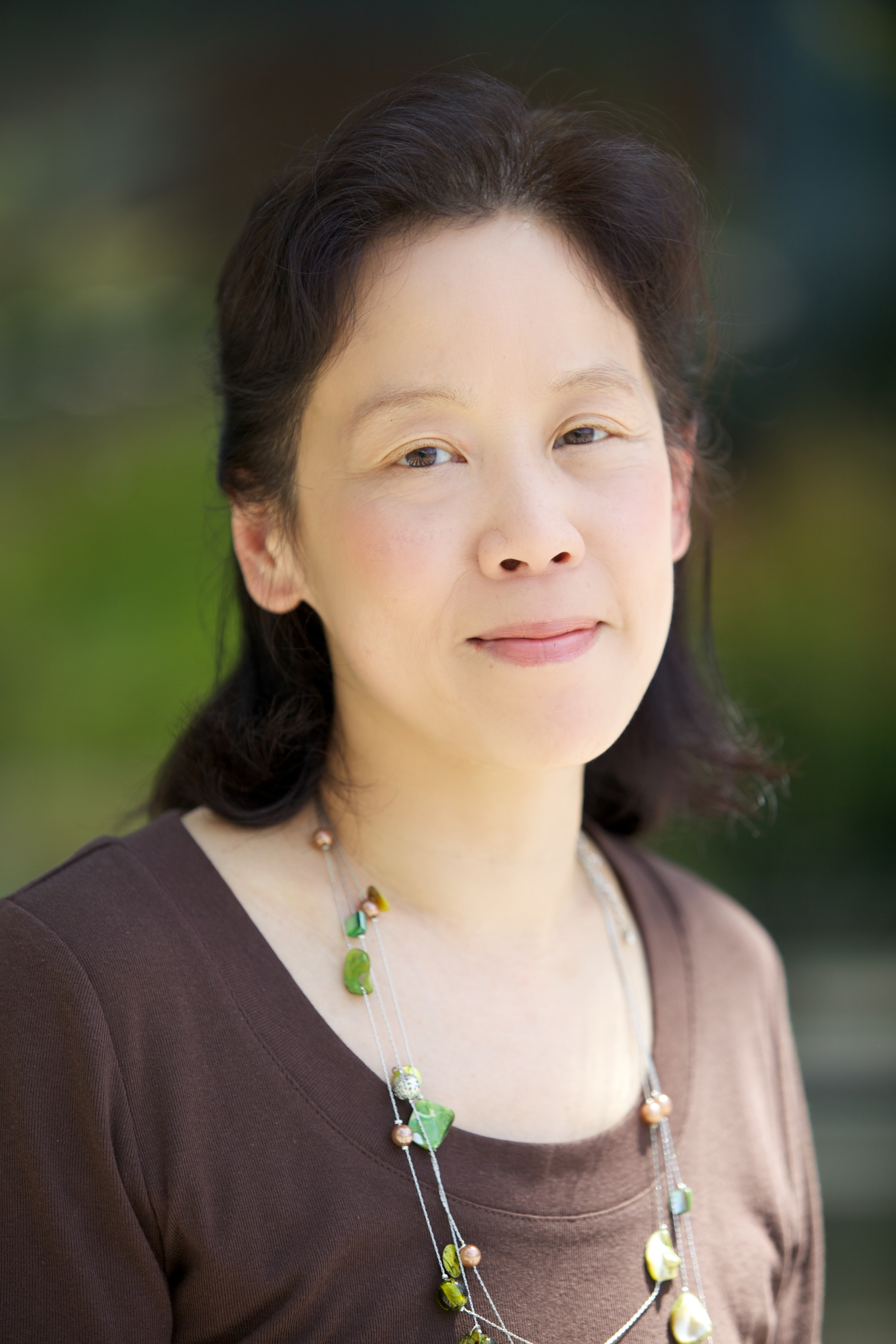
- Lee in 2012
- Education: University of British Columbia (BA); University of Victoria (MPA); University of Sussex (MA, DPhil)
- Scientific career
- Workplaces: London School of Hygiene & Tropical Medicine; Simon Fraser University

Kelley Lee (born May 5, 1962) is a Tier 1 Canada Research Chair in Global Health Governance and Professor of Global Public Health in the Faculty of Health Sciences at Simon Fraser University. She has studied the impact of globalisation on public health, with a particular focus on the tobacco industry. During the COVID-19 pandemic Lee initiated and led the Pandemics and Borders Project to understand effective ways to mitigate the spread of SARS-CoV-2 through the effective use of travel measures.

== Early life and education ==
Lee earned her bachelor's degree at the University of British Columbia. She moved to the University of Victoria to complete a Master of Public Administration, before joining the University of Sussex to specialise in international relations. She completed a doctorate in international political economy at the University of Sussex before joining the London School of Hygiene & Tropical Medicine in 1992.

== Research and career ==
Lee led the World Health Organization Collaborating Centre on Global Change and Health at the London School of Hygiene & Tropical Medicine. Here she led the Public and Environmental Health Research Unit and studied the relationships between trade and global health. Whilst some argue that globalisation only drives inequality, others believe that it is a positive force which will eventually improve the lives of all. Her work considered how global health intersected with foreign policy. In particular, Lee works on tobacco control and the globalisation of communicable and non-communicable diseases. Whilst Lee believed that the WHO Framework Convention on Tobacco Control was an important achievement, she has argued that the WHO must take into account the increasing globalisation of the tobacco industry.

She joined Simon Fraser University (SFU) in 2011 where she was appointed Associate Dean for Research and Director of Global Health. At SFU Lee led the Global Tobacco Control Research Programme. She was appointed a Canada Research Chair in Global Health Governance in 2015. Her chair was renewed in 2022. Lee has investigated the role of the WHO in international health cooperation and its role in supporting collective action in response to global health challenges. Her research has shown that collective action and cooperation is essential to improve the global response to pandemics, including severe acute respiratory syndrome (SARS), Ebola and HIV/AIDS. In 2018 Lee was selected by the Canadian Society for International Health as one of the leading women in global health.

Lee is leading a Canadian Institutes of Health Research (CIHR) research program to evaluate the efficacy of coronavirus prevention strategies. She looked to define and categorise the various measures adopted by countries and corporations, and compare these approaches with datasets from historical pandemic responses. By understanding the effectiveness of various prevention strategies, Lee looks to mitigate the spread of SARS-CoV-2. When asked by the Rolling Stone magazine what she thought of the WHO response to coronavirus disease, Lee was impressed by their proactive approach, "it has kept us informed. It has mobilized scientists and coordinated data and research. It has collected the best evidence and tried to put forward very clear guidance about what should be done. The big question is whether we've given it enough authority and resources to act the way we want it to act". She believes that the WHO struggles to respond quickly to emerging disasters because of underfunding, as well as trying to deal with global politics and bureaucracy. She has said that SARS-CoV-2 may cause the world to ask profound questions about how we govern the world, "I used to say it would take a really big outbreak or catastrophe. Now it's here. We've got it. If we can learn from this one we'll be so much better equipped for the next one. But people just don't want to face those questions".

Lee has said that people who smoke and vape are at a greater risk to become infected by coronavirus disease. Researchers in Wuhan identified that smokers were fourteen times more likely to have coronavirus disease progression. Lee has called for British Columbia Ministry of Health to expand their Smoking Cessation Program during the outbreak.

== Selected publications ==
- McInnes, Colin; Lee, Kelley (27 February 2006). "Health, security and foreign policy". Review of International Studies. 32 (1): 5–23. doi:10.1017/S0260210506006905. hdl:2160/812. S2CID 30758159.
- Lee, Kelley; Buse, Kent; Fustukian, Suzanne, eds. (September 2009). Health Policy in a Globalising World. Cambridge: Cambridge University Press. doi:10.1017/CBO9780511489037. ISBN 978-0-511-48903-7.
- Moon, Suerie; Sridhar, Devi; Pate, Muhammad A; Jha, Ashish K; Clinton, Chelsea; Delaunay, Sophie; Edwin, Valnora; Fallah, Mosoka; Fidler, David P; Garrett, Laurie; Goosby, Eric; Gostin, Lawrence O; Heymann, David L; Lee, Kelley; Leung, Gabriel M; Morrison, J Stephen; Saavedra, Jorge; Tanner, Marcel; Leigh, Jennifer A; Hawkins, Benjamin; Woskie, Liana R; Piot, Peter (November 2015). "Will Ebola change the game? Ten essential reforms before the next pandemic. The report of the Harvard-LSHTM Independent Panel on the Global Response to Ebola". The Lancet. 386 (10009): 2204–2221. doi:10.1016/S0140-6736(15)00946-0. PMC 7137174. PMID 26615326.
- Dodgson, Richard; Lee, Kelley; Drager, Nick (15 May 2017). "Chapter 28: Global Health Governance, A Conceptual Review". In Kirton, John J. (ed.). Global Health. London: Routledge. doi:10.4324/9781315254227-33. ISBN 978-1-315-25422-7.
