= William Thomas Gordon =

Scottish palaeontologist and palaeobotanist

William Thomas Gordon FRSE FGS FGSE FLS FGA (1884–1950) was a Scottish palaeontologist and palaeobotanist in the early 20th century. He was also an expert on diamonds and gemstones and assisted Hatton Garden in the testing of rare stones.

== Life ==
He was born in Glasgow on 27 January 1884, the son of Mary (née Patterson) and William Gordon a marine engineer and surveyor. The family moved to Edinburgh when he was young, living at 89 Ferry Road in the Leith district. He was educated at George Heriot's School, then studied sciences at the University of Edinburgh, graduating with an MA BSc. He received his DSc. from the University of Edinburgh in 1911 for his thesis The fossil flora of the Pettycur limestone. This included studying geology under Professor James Geikie. From 1910 to 1912 he undertook postgraduate research at the University of Cambridge, gaining a further MA.

In 1912 he returned to the University of Edinburgh as a lecturer in palaeontology. In the same year he was elected a Fellow of the Royal Society of Edinburgh. His proposers were James Geikie, John Horne, Sir Isaac Bayley Balfour, Robert Kidston and Ben Peach. He won the Society’s Makdougall Brisbane Prize in 1922.

In 1914 he took up a post of lecturer in geology at King’s College London. In 1920 he became a full professor and remained until his retiral in 1949.

He died on 13 December 1950. He was unmarried and had no children.

== Positions and awards ==
- Makdougall Brisbane Prize 1920–22
- British Geological Society’s Lyell Prize 1923
- Vice President of the Geological Society of London 1937-39
- Fellow of the Mineralogical Society of America 1938 onwards

== Publications ==
The standard author abbreviation W.T.Gordon is used to indicate this person as the author when citing a botanical name.

- Discovery of Gold in Devon (1922)
- Preparation of Thin Rock Sections (1926)
- Gem Stones (1933)
- The Chemistry of Gemstones (1943)
