= Maria Amélia Martins-Loução =

Biologist and professor

Maria Amélia Martins-Loução (full name Maria Amélia Botelho de Paulo Martins Campos Loução) is a biologist, retired full professor from the Faculty of Sciences at the University of Lisbon. She received the Ibero-American Botany Prize, the Cortes de Cadiz Prize (2010), and was recognized as one of the 100 Women Scientists by Ciência Viva (2016).

== Publications ==
She is the author of over 200 works, including book chapters and international articles, as well as more than 40 science communication articles.

=== Books ===
- Cruz, C.; Martins-Loução, M.A.; Varma, A. (2010) The influence of plant co-culture of tomato plants with Piriformospora indica on biomass accumulation and stress tolerance.
- Magos Brehm, J.; Mitchell, M.; Maxted, N.; Ford-Lloyd, B.V.; Martins-Loução, M.A.; Brehm, J.M.; Ford-Lloyd, B. V.; Martins-Loução, M.A. (2007) IUCN red listing of crop wildrelatives: Is a national approaches difficult as some think? CABI. 10.1079/9781845930998.0211
- Romano, A.; Martins-Loução, M.A. (2003) Water loss and morphological modifications in leaves during acclimatization of cork oak micropropagated plantlets.
- Romano, A.; Martins-Loução, M.A. (2003) Strategies to improve rooting and acclimatization of cork oak.
- Marques, P.M.; Ferreira, L.; Correia, O.; Martins-Loução, M.A. (2001) Tree shelters influence growth and survival of carob (Ceratonia siliqua L.) and cork oak (Quercus suber L.) plants on degraded Mediterranean sites. WIT Press. Southampton. Boston.
- Martins-Loução, M.A.; Carvalho, J. H. Brito de. (1989) A cultura da alfarrobeira. Direcção Geral de Planeamento e Agricultura.

=== Books edition ===
- Martins-Loução, M.A. (2021) Riscos Globais e Biodiversidade. Lisbon, Portugal: Fundação Francisco Manuel dos Santos.
- Martins Loução, M.A. (2020) Aventuras num admirável mundo invisível. Lisbon, Portugal: Flamingo Edições.
- Martins-Loução, M.A. (2011) A Aventura da Terra. Um Planeta em Evolução. Lisbon, Portugal: Esfera do Caos.

== Awards ==
- 2021 Grande Prémio Ciência Viva 2021 - Ciência Viva, Portugal
- 2019 Prémio de Distinção with the video “The two faces of nitrogen" - Casa das Ciências, Portugal
- 2016 100 Women Scientists - Ciência Viva, Portugal
- 2010 Prémio Iberoamericano de Botânica - Cortes de Cadiz, Spain
- 2006 Correspondente Estrangeiro da Academia - Real Academia Nacional de Farmacia, Spain
- 1986 Correspondente Estrangeiro - Consejo Superior de Investigaciones Científicas, Spain
- 1985 Honorary Member - Associação Interprofissional para o Desenvolvimento e Valorização da Alfarrobeira, Portugal
