= Charles Robertson Marshall =

British physician

Charles Robertson Marshall FRSE was an early 20th century British physician.

== Life ==
In May 1894 he became assistant to Prof John Buckley Bradbury at Cambridge University. He left in 1899 to become Professor of Materia Medica and Therapeutics at St Andrews University. From 1910 to 1930 he was Regius Professor of Materia Medica at Aberdeen University.

He was elected a Fellow of the Royal Society of Edinburgh in 1909. His proposers were Sir D'Arcy Wentworth Thompson, Sir James Walker, William Peddie, and Sir Thomas Richard Fraser. He won the Society's Makdougall-Brisbane Prize for the period 1912 to 1914. He resigned from the Society in 1928.

== Publications ==
- A Textbook of Materia Medica (1905)
- The Place of Materia Medica and Therapeutics in the Medical Curriculum (1906)
