= Edward McWilliam Patterson =

English mathematician

Edward McWilliam Patterson, FRSE (30 July 1926 – 5 April 2013) was an English mathematician.

He was born in Whitby, North Yorkshire, the son of parents from Northern Ireland, and educated at the local Lady Lumley's school and Leeds University, where he graduated B.Sc in mathematics and was awarded a Ph.D. on the subject of differential geometry.

From 1959 to 1951 he was a demonstrator at Sheffield University before moving to St Andrews in to take up a post as lecturer for five years. After three further years as a lecturer in Leeds, he returned to Scotland in 1959 as a senior lecturer at the University of Aberdeen. The same year he was elected a fellow of the Royal Society of Edinburgh. In 1965 he was made professor of mathematics at Aberdeen and in 1974 became head of department, a position he held alternately with Professor John Hubbuck until his retirement in 1989. From 1981 to 1984 he also served as dean of science.

His mathematical work was originally geometry-based, and he published a textbook entitled Topology in 1956. He later switched to algebra, especially ring theory and Lie algebra, and published two textbooks, Elementary Abstract Algebra in 1965, in collaboration with Professor Dan Rutherford, and Vector Algebra in 1968.

He was awarded the Makdougall Brisbane Prize by the Royal Society of Edinburgh for 1960–1962. He was president of the Edinburgh Mathematical Society from 1964 to 1965 and served as a councillor for The Royal Society of Edinburgh from 1966 to 1968. He also served on the council of The London Mathematical Society.

He died in Aberdeen in 2013. He had married twice: firstly Joan Maddick, with whom he had a daughter, Christine and secondly, after her death, Elizabeth Hunter.
