= John McInnes (footballer, born 1927) =

Scottish footballer (1927–1973)

Personal information
- Full name: John Smith McInnes
- Date of birth: 11 August 1927
- Place of birth: Glasgow, Scotland
- Date of death: October 1973 (aged 46)
- Place of death: Bedford, England
- Position: Winger

Senior career*
| Years | Team | Apps | (Gls) |
| 1946–1947 | Morton | 21 | (5) |
| 1947–1950 | Chelsea | 37 | (7) |
- Bedford Town
| Total | | 58 | (12) |
- * Club domestic league appearances and goals

John Smith McInnes (11 August 1927 – October 1973) was a Scottish professional footballer who played as a winger.

== Career ==
Born in Glasgow, McInnes played for Morton, Chelsea and Bedford Town.
