= Thomas McInnes =

Thomas or Tom McInnes may refer to:

- Thomas Robert McInnes (1840–1904), Canadian politician
- Tom McInnes (footballer, born 1869) (1869–1939), Scottish international footballer for Notts County, Everton, Luton Town and Third Lanark
- Tom McInnes (footballer, born 1873) (1873–1937), Scottish footballer for Nottingham Forest and Lincoln City
- Tom MacInnes (1867–1951), né McInnes, Canadian poet and writer

== See also ==
- Tom McInnis (Canadian politician) (born 1945), Canadian politician
- Tom McInnis (North Carolina politician) (born 1954), American politician
