= John McInnes (footballer, born 1923) =

Scottish footballer (1923–1998)

Personal information
- Date of birth: 29 March 1923
- Place of birth: Ayr, Scotland
- Date of death: 8 February 1998 (aged 74)
- Place of death: Lochgilphead, Scotland
- Position: Inside forward

Senior career*
| Years | Team | Apps | (Gls) |
| 1946–1948 | Partick Thistle | 8 | (2) |
| 1948–1949 | Raith Rovers | 0 | (0) |
| 1949–1951 | Bradford City | 21 | (6) |
| Total | | 29 | (8) |
- * Club domestic league appearances and goals

John McInnes (29 March 1923 – 8 February 1998) was a Scottish professional footballer who played as an inside forward.

== Career ==
Born in Ayr, McInnes spent his early career with Partick Thistle and Raith Rovers.

McInnes joined Bradford City in May 1949. He made 21 league appearances for the club, scoring 6 goals He left the club in August 1951 after being released.

== Sources ==
- Frost, Terry (1988). Bradford City A Complete Record 1903-1988. Breedon Books Sport. ISBN 0-907969-38-0.
