= John McInnes (Australian footballer) =

Australian rules footballer

Personal information
- Full name: John Allan McInnes
- Born: 3 September 1884; Batesford, Victoria
- Died: 4 June 1950 (aged 65); Geelong, Victoria

Playing career^{1}
Years	Club	Games (Goals)
1905	Geelong	1 (2)
- ^{1} Playing statistics correct to the end of 1905.

John Allan McInnes (3 September 1884 – 4 June 1950) was an Australian rules footballer who played with Geelong in the Victorian Football League (VFL).
