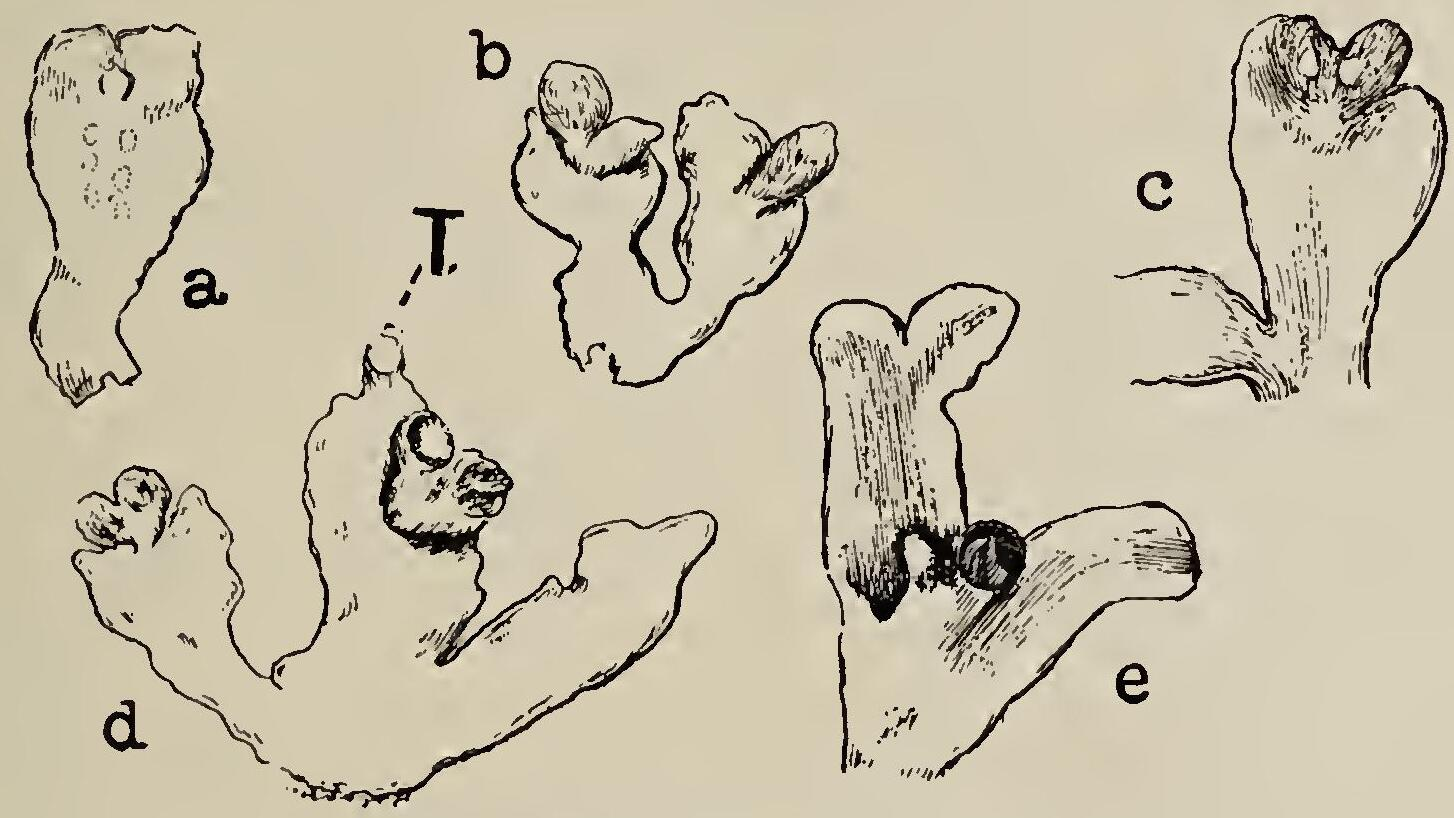
- Aitchisoniella himalayensis

Scientific classification
- Kingdom: Plantae
- Division: Marchantiophyta
- Class: Marchantiopsida
- Order: Marchantiales
- Family: Exormothecaceae; Müll.Frib. ex Grolle, 1972

Genera
- Aitchisoniella; Exormotheca; Stephensoniella

= Exormothecaceae =

Family of liverworts

Exormothecaceae is a family of liverworts in the order Marchantiales.

== Genera in the family Exormothecaceae ==
The family includes three genera:

- Aitchisoniella Kashyap
- Exormotheca Mitt.
- Stephensoniella Kashyap
