= George Chrystal =

Scottish mathematician (1851–1911)

George Chrystal FRSE
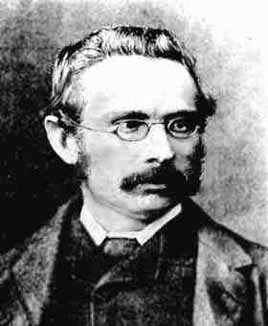
- George Chrystal (1851–1911)
- Born: 8 March 1851; Old Meldrum, Scotland, UK
- Died: 3 November 1911 (aged 60); Edinburgh, Scotland, UK
- Resting place: Foveran Churchyard, Aberdeenshire
- Education: University of Aberdeen; Peterhouse, Cambridge
- Known for: Experimental verification of Ohm's law Chrystal's equation
- Spouse: Margaret Anne Balfour (1870-1903 her death)
- Awards: Royal Medal (1911)
- Scientific career
- Fields: Physicist and mathematician
- Workplaces: University of St Andrews; University of Cambridge; University of Edinburgh
- Academic advisors: James Clerk Maxwell
- Notable students: Joseph Wedderburn

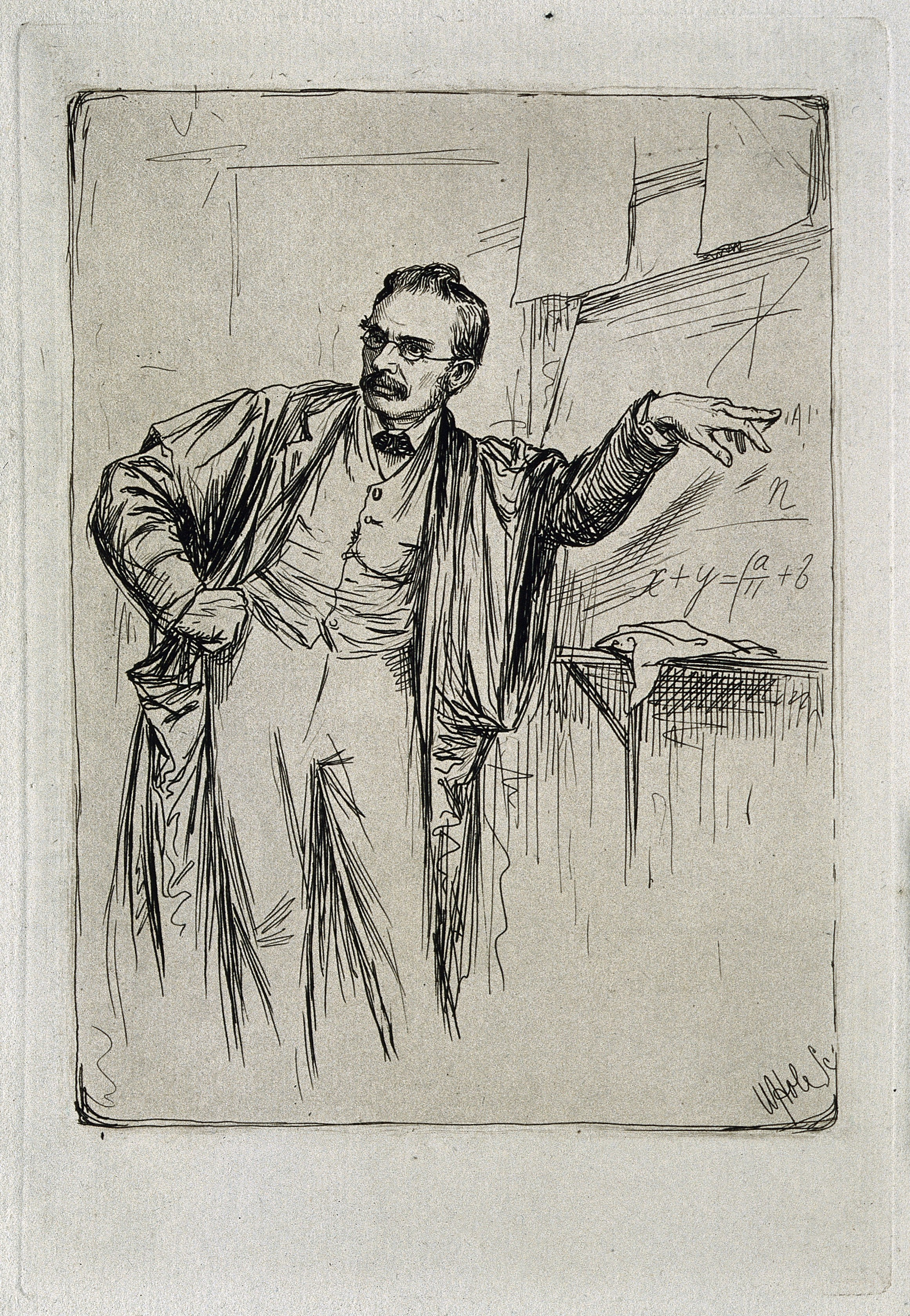
George Chrystal at work. Etching by W. Hole, 1884

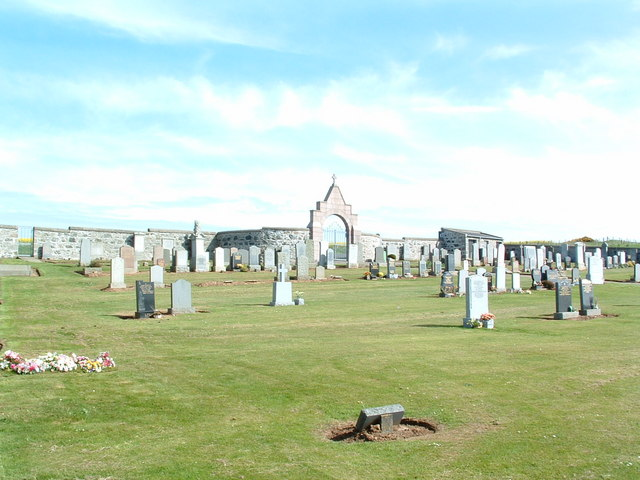
Foveran Churchyard

George Chrystal FRSE (8 March 1851 – 3 November 1911) was a Scottish mathematician. He is primarily known for his books on algebra and his studies of seiches (wave patterns in large inland bodies of water) which earned him a Gold Medal from the Royal Society of London that was confirmed shortly after his death.

== Life ==
He was born in Old Meldrum on 8 March 1851, the son of Margaret (née Burr) and William Chrystal, a wealthy farmer and grain merchant.

He was educated at Aberdeen Grammar School and the University of Aberdeen. In 1872, he moved to study under James Clerk Maxwell at Peterhouse, Cambridge. He graduated Second Wrangler in 1875, joint with William Burnside, and was elected a fellow of Corpus Christi. He was appointed to the Regius Chair of Mathematics at the University of St Andrews in 1877, and then in 1879 to the Chair in Mathematics at the University of Edinburgh. In 1911, he was awarded the Royal Medal of the Royal Society for his researches into the surface oscillations of Scottish lochs.

He was a contributor to the drafting of the Universities (Scotland) Act 1889, and was one of the founders of the Edinburgh Mathematical Society.

He was elected a Fellow of the Royal Society of Edinburgh in 1880, his proposers including James Clerk Maxwell. He was awarded the Society's Keith Medal for 1879-81 and their Gunning Victoria Jubilee Prize for the period 1904–8. He served as Vice President of the Society from 1895-1901 and General Secretary from 1901–1911. He is credited with instigating the move of the Society from the Mound to George Street.

He was awarded honorary doctorates (LLD) from the University of Aberdeen in 1887 and the University of Glasgow in 1911.

In later life he is listed as living at 5 Belgrave Crescent in western Edinburgh.

The mathematician Alexander G. Burgess trained under him.

He grew ill in 1909 and this worsened early in 1911, leading the University to grant him leave of absence from April of that year. A work-free summer did not improve him. He died on 3 November 1911 at 5 Belgrave Crescent in Edinburgh. He is buried in Foveran Churchyard in Aberdeenshire.

== Family ==
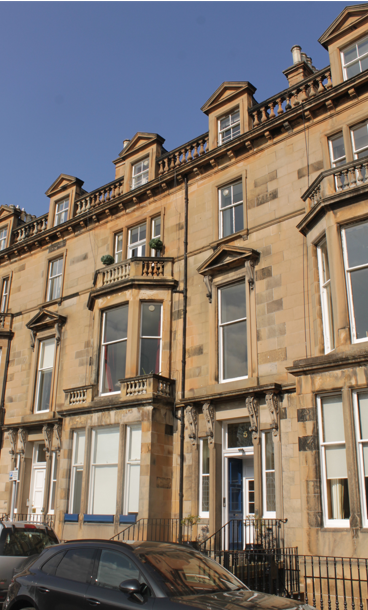
5 Belgrave Crescent, Edinburgh

He married Margaret Anne Balfour (1851-1903) in 1879. She died before him and is buried in the northern Victorian extension to Dean Cemetery with their son Walter MacDonald Chrystal who died in infancy. They had four sons and two daughters.

== Publications ==
- Chrystal, George (May 1999) [1886]. Algebra: An Elementary Text-Book for the Higher Classes of Secondary Schools and for Colleges. (Volumes I & II) (7 ed.). American Mathematical Society. ISBN 978-0-8218-1931-9. (Out of copyright: 1900 and subsequent editions are available in reprint or online.)
- Chrystal, George (1914) [1889]. Introduction to Algebra: For the use of Secondary Schools and Technical Colleges (Out of copyright: this edition is available in reprint or online.)
- Three articles within the 1911 edition of Encyclopædia Britannica: Pascal, Blaise; Perpetual Motion; and Riemann, Georg Friedrich Bernhard.
