= Colin R. McInnes =

British engineer

Colin Robert McInnes MBE FRSE FInstP FREng
- Born: 1968
- Education: University of Glasgow
- Known for: Solar sails
- Scientific career
- Workplaces: University of Glasgow; University of Strathclyde
- Thesis: Advanced trajectories for solar sail spacecraft (1991)
- Notable students: Malcolm Macdonald

Colin Robert McInnes is a Scottish engineer known for his work in solar sails. He is currently one of the leading figures in the field, being the author (or co-author) of over 50 solar sail papers since 2001. He also wrote a book on the subject, Solar Sailing: Technology, Dynamics and Mission Applications, which is commonly referenced in solar sail journal papers.

McInnes obtained a BSc (Hons) in Physics and Astronomy and PhD in Astrodynamics from the University of Glasgow in 1988 and 1991 respectively, during which he independently invented (in parallel with Robert Forward) the concept variously known as the solar sail halo orbit, the statite, the artificial Lagrange point and the non-Keplerian orbit. He was then appointed as a lecturer in the Department of Aerospace Engineering at the University of Glasgow in October 1991 and was subsequently Reader (1996) and Professor (1999). During this time he was a visiting researcher at the Central Design Bureau for Unique Instrumentation, Moscow, and the Institute for Space and Astronautical Science, Tokyo. He joined the Department of Mechanical Engineering at the University of Strathclyde in September 2004; in 2014 he moved back to the University of Glasgow.

His research interests centre on trajectory and mission analysis for solar sails (about which he has written an authoritative textbook), autonomous spacecraft control and space robotics. He is a fellow of the Royal Society of Edinburgh and was elected a Fellow of the Royal Academy of Engineering in July 2003.

He is currently the James Watt Chair, and Professor of Engineering Science (Systems Power and Energy) at the University of Glasgow.

He was appointed Member of the Order of the British Empire (MBE) in the 2014 Birthday Honours for services to space research, science, and technology.

== Bibliography ==
- C. R. McInnes, Solar Sailing: Technology, Dynamics, and Mission Applications, Springer-Praxis Publishing Ltd, Chichester, UK, 1999, ISBN 978-3-540-21062-7
