= William Peddie =

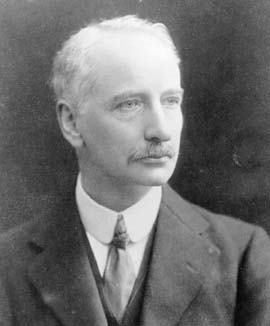
William Peddie (ca 1910)

William Peddie FRSE LLD (31 May 1861 – 2 June 1946) was a Scottish physicist and applied mathematician, known for his research on colour vision and molecular magnetism.

== Life ==
He was born in Papa Westray in Orkney on 31 May 1861 the son of Rev John Peddie and his wife, Marion Beashe. He was educated at Kirkwall Grammar School.

He studied Mathematics and Physics at the University of Edinburgh graduating BSc in 1887 and gaining a doctorate (DSc) in 1888. He had been assisting in lectures in Natural Philosophy (Physics) since 1883 and became a formal lecturer in 1892. In 1907 he succeeded J. P. Kuenen as Professor of Physics at University College, Dundee, a post he would hold for 35 years.

He wrote numerous scientific papers and several books. He annotated the 5th edition of Tait's Properties of Matter.

In 1887 he was elected a Fellow of the Royal Society of Edinburgh. His proposers were Peter Guthrie Tait, Sir Thomas Muir, George Chrystal, and Alexander Crum Brown. He was awarded the Society's Makdougall-Brisbane Prize for 1896–1898, and served as the Society's vice president from 1919 to 1922. He was President of the Edinburgh Mathematical Society 1896/97. He was an Invited Speaker of the ICM in 1912 at Cambridge, UK.

He retired in 1942 and died at Ninewells Hospital on 2 June 1946.

His position was filled by Prof George Dawson Preston.

== Family ==
In 1891 he married Jessie Isabella Dott (d.1927).

== Selected publications ==
- A Manual of Physics. 1891. Revised & enlarged 2nd edition. New York: G. P. Putnam's Sons. 1896.
- "The Elementary Dynamics of Solids and Fluids". Nature. 79 (2052): 486. 1909. Bibcode:1909Natur..79T.486.. doi:10.1038/079486e0. S2CID 4059572.
- Colour Vision. 1922.
- Molecular Magnetism. 1929.
