= Colin J. McInnes =

British academic

Colin John McInnes FRSA FAcSS FLSW (born 18 June 1960) is pro vice chancellor (research, knowledge exchange and innovation) at Aberystwyth University and holds a personal professorial chair in the Department of International Politics there, where his research focuses on global health politics. He is a Fellow of the Academy of Social Sciences and a Fellow of the Royal Society for the Arts. In 2014 he was appointed by the secretary of state for international development as a non-executive director of the UK National Commission (UKNC) for UNESCO, with special responsibility for the social and human sciences, and represents the UK on UNESCO’s Social and Human Sciences Commission. He was elected chair of the UKNC in 2019 and in this role works closely with the British government, UNESCO designations and UNESCO HQ in Paris. In 2017 he received the Special Achievement Award at the inaugural Wales Social Research awards, for his 'outstanding personal achievement in research'. In 2022, he was elected a Fellow of the Learned Society of Wales.

He was previously a lecturer in the Department of War Studies, The Royal Military Academy Sandhurst; visiting research fellow at King's College London; and special adviser to the House of Commons Defence Committee. He was also chair of the British International Studies Association; a member of the ESRC's strategic research board and international advisory committee; member of WHO's expert group on Global Health Diplomacy; and director of the UK Research Councils' Security Research Forum. From 2007 to 2018 he held the UNESCO Chair in HIV/AIDS, reflecting his research interests at that time. In 2019 he was a consultant to the World Health Organization, developing their framework for civil-military collaboration in health emergencies. He recently advised Public Health Wales on its development of an international health strategy, and the InterAction Council (a group of over 40 former presidents and prime ministers) on global health issues. He was on the REF 2014 Politics and International Studies panel and is on the REF 2021 panel for both the criteria and assessment stage as well as being an interdisciplinary panel member.

== Research ==
Colin McInnes’ research currently focuses on global health politics, and especially the role of militaries in health crises. He has published widely on the security implications of HIV/AIDS, on health and foreign policy, on global health security, and on global health governance. His more recent research addressed the use of social media during health crises, and the nature of risk in global health. He is the co-editor of the Oxford Handbook on Global Health Politics (2020).

== Selected publications ==
For a full list of publications, see: https://pure.aber.ac.uk/portal/en/persons/colin-mcinnes(3b27268e-c396-4a4b-bcbb-2a1f4ff748f7)/publications.html

- 'Oxford Handbook of Global Health Politics' (New York: Oxford University Press, 2020). Editor with Kelley Lee and Jeremy Youde.
- '"Add Twitter and Stir": The use of Twitter by public authorities in Norway and UK during the 2014-15 Ebola outbreak’, Observatorio (OBS*), 12:2 (2018), 023-046. doi: 10.15847/obsOBS12220181173. With Harald Hornmoen.
- ‘From security to risk: reframing global health threats’, International Affairs 93:6 (2017) 1313-1337, with Anne Roemer-Mahler.
- ‘Crisis! What crisis? The construction of global health and the response to the 2014 Ebola outbreak’, Third World Quarterly 37:3 (March 2016), pp. 380–400.
- ‘WHO’s next: changing authority in global health governance’, International Affairs 91/6 (November 2015), pp. 1299–1316.
- ‘Health for health’s sake, winning for God’s sake: global health diplomacy and smart power in Iraq and Afghanistan’, Review of International Studies 40/5 (2014), pp. 835–57. With Simon Rushton.
