= Thom's second isotopy lemma =

In mathematics, especially in differential topology, Thom's second isotopy lemma is a family version of Thom's first isotopy lemma; i.e., it states a family of maps between Whitney stratified spaces is locally trivial when it is a Thom mapping. Like the first isotopy lemma, the lemma was introduced by René Thom.

(Mather 2012, § 11) gives a sketch of the proof. (Verona 1984) gives a simplified proof. Like the first isotopy lemma, the lemma also holds for the stratification with Bekka's condition (C), which is weaker than Whitney's condition (B).

== Thom mapping ==
Let $f : M \to N$ be a smooth map between smooth manifolds and $X, Y \subset M$ submanifolds such that $f|_X, f|_Y$ both have differential of constant rank. Then Thom's condition $(a_f)$ is said to hold if for each sequence $x_i$ in X converging to a point y in Y and such that $\operatorname{ker}(d(f|_{X})_{x_i})$ converging to a plane $\tau$ in the Grassmannian, we have $\operatorname{ker}(d(f|_Y)_y) \subset \tau.$

Let $S \subset M, S' \subset N$ be Whitney stratified closed subsets and $p : S \to Z, q : S' \to Z$ maps to some smooth manifold Z such that $f : S \to S'$ is a map over Z; i.e., $f(S) \subset S'$ and $q \circ f|_S = p$. Then $f$ is called a Thom mapping if the following conditions hold:

- $f|_S, q$ are proper.
- $q$ is a submersion on each stratum of $S'$.
- For each stratum X of S, $f(X)$ lies in a stratum Y of $S'$ and $f : X \to Y$ is a submersion.
- Thom's condition $(a_f)$ holds for each pair of strata of $S$.

Then Thom's second isotopy lemma says that a Thom mapping is locally trivial over Z; i.e., each point z of Z has a neighborhood U with homeomorphisms $h_1 : p^{-1}(z) \times U \to p^{-1}(U), h_2 : q^{-1}(z) \times U \to q^{-1}(U)$ over U such that $f \circ h_1 = h_2 \circ (f|_{p^{-1}(z)} \times \operatorname{id})$.

== See also ==
- Thom–Mather stratified space – Way of decomposing a topological space
- Thom's first isotopy lemma – Theorem
