= Swallowtail =

Swallowtail may refer to:

- Swallowtail butterfly, large colorful butterflies from the family Papilionidae
- Swallowtail Butterfly (film), 1996 film directed by Shunji Iwai
- Swallowtail catastrophe or swallowtail surface, a singularity occurring in the part of mathematics called catastrophe theory
- Swallow-tail coat, a formal tailcoat worn traditionally as part of the white tie dress code
- Swallowtail (flag), a term in vexillology
- Swallowtail joint in woodworking, see Dovetail joint
- The Swallow's Tail, a painting by Salvador Dalí, inspired by the swallowtail catastrophe
- Swallowtail, a butler café in Tokyo, Japan
- Swallowtail, a Wolf Alice song from their debut album My Love Is Cool
- Swallowtail (album), 2024 album by Jim White and Marisa Anderson
- The SSC Swallowtail, a mech in the tabletop role-playing game Lancer.

== See also ==
- Swallowtail Butterfly (Ai no Uta), the theme song for the film Swallowtail
