= Thom–Mather stratified space =

Way of decomposing a topological space

In topology, a branch of mathematics, an abstract stratified space, or a Thom–Mather stratified space is a topological space X that has been decomposed into pieces called strata; these strata are manifolds and are required to fit together in a certain way. Thom–Mather stratified spaces provide a purely topological setting for the study of singularities analogous to the more differential-geometric theory of Whitney. They were introduced in 1969 by René Thom, who showed that every Whitney stratified space was also a topologically stratified space, with the same strata. Another proof was given by John Mather in 1970, inspired by Thom's proof.

Basic examples of Thom–Mather stratified spaces include manifolds with boundary (top dimension and codimension 1 boundary) and manifolds with corners (top dimension, codimension 1 boundary, codimension 2 corners), real or complex analytic varieties, or orbit spaces of smooth transformation groups.

== Definition ==
A Thom–Mather stratified space is a triple $(V, {\mathcal S}, {\mathfrak J})$ where $V$ is a topological space (often we require that it is locally compact, Hausdorff, and second countable), ${\mathcal S}$ is a decomposition of $V$ into strata,

$$V = \bigsqcup_{X\in {\mathcal S}} X,$$

and ${\mathfrak J}$ is the set of control data $\{ (T_X), (\pi_X), (\rho_X)\ | X\in S\}$ where $T_X$ is an open neighborhood of the stratum $X$ (called the tubular neighborhood), $\pi_X: T_X \to X$ is a continuous retraction, and $\rho_X: T_X \to [0, +\infty)$ is a continuous function. These data need to satisfy the following conditions.

1. Each stratum $X$ is a locally closed subset and the decomposition $S$ is locally finite.
2. The decomposition $S$ satisfies the axiom of the frontier: if $X, Y \in {\mathcal S}$ and $Y \cap \overline{X} \neq \emptyset$, then $Y \subseteq \overline{X}$. This condition implies that there is a partial order among strata: $Y<X$ if and only if $Y \subset\overline{X}$ and $Y \neq X$.
3. Each stratum $X$ is a smooth manifold.
4. $X = \{ v \in T_X\ |\ \rho_X(v) = 0\}$. So $\rho_X$ can be viewed as the distance function from the stratum $X$.
5. For each pair of strata $Y<X$, the restriction $(\pi_Y, \rho_Y): T_Y \cap X \to Y \times (0, +\infty)$ is a submersion.
6. For each pair of strata $Y<X$, there holds $\pi_Y \circ \pi_X = \pi_Y$ and $\rho_Y \circ \pi_X = \rho_Y$ (both over the common domain of both sides of the equation).

== Examples ==
One of the original motivations for stratified spaces were decomposing singular spaces into smooth chunks. For example, given a singular variety $X$, there is a naturally defined subvariety, $\mathrm{Sing}(X)$, which is the singular locus. This may not be a smooth variety, so taking the iterated singularity locus $\mathrm{Sing}(\mathrm{Sing}(X))$ will eventually give a natural stratification. A simple algebreo-geometric example is the singular hypersurface

$\text{Spec}\left(\Complex[x,y,z]/\left(x^4 + y^4 + z^4\right)\right) \xleftarrow{(0,0,0)} \text{Spec}(\Complex)$

where $\text{Spec}(-)$ is the prime spectrum.

== See also ==
- Singularity theory
- Whitney conditions
- Stratifold
- Intersection homology
- Thom's first isotopy lemma
- stratified space
