= History of manifolds and varieties =

The study of manifolds combines many important areas of mathematics: it generalizes concepts such as curves and surfaces as well as ideas from linear algebra and topology. Certain special classes of manifolds also have additional algebraic structure; they may behave like groups, for instance. In that case, they are called Lie groups. Alternatively, they may be described by polynomial equations, in which case they are called algebraic varieties, and if they additionally carry a group structure, they are called algebraic groups.

== Nomenclature ==
The term "manifold" comes from German Mannigfaltigkeit, by Bernhard Riemann.

In English, "manifold" refers to spaces with a differentiable or topological structure, while "variety" refers to spaces with an algebraic structure, as in algebraic varieties.

In Romance languages, manifold is translated as "variety" – such spaces with a differentiable structure are literally translated as "analytic varieties", while spaces with an algebraic structure are called "algebraic varieties". Thus for example, the French word "variété topologique" means topological manifold. In the same vein, the Japanese word "多様体" (tayōtai) also encompasses both manifold and variety. ("多様" (tayō) means various.)

== Background ==
Ancestral to the modern concept of a manifold were several important results of 18th and 19th century mathematics. The oldest of these was Non-Euclidean geometry, which considers spaces where Euclid's parallel postulate fails. Saccheri first studied this geometry in 1733. Lobachevsky, Bolyai, and Riemann developed the subject further 100 years later. Their research uncovered two types of spaces whose geometric structures differ from that of classical Euclidean space; these are called hyperbolic geometry and elliptic geometry. In the modern theory of manifolds, these notions correspond to manifolds with constant, negative and positive curvature, respectively.

Carl Friedrich Gauss may have been the first to consider abstract spaces as mathematical objects in their own right. His theorema egregium gives a method for computing the curvature of a surface without considering the ambient space in which the surface lies. In modern terms, the theorem proved that the curvature of the surface is an intrinsic property. Manifold theory has come to focus exclusively on these intrinsic properties (or invariants), while largely ignoring the extrinsic properties of the ambient space.

Another, more topological example of an intrinsic property of a manifold is the Euler characteristic. For a non-intersecting graph in the Euclidean plane, with V vertices (or corners), E edges and F faces (counting the exterior) Euler showed that V-E+F= 2. Thus 2 is called the Euler characteristic of the plane. By contrast, in 1813 Antoine-Jean Lhuilier showed that the Euler characteristic of the torus is 0, since the complete graph on seven points can be embedded into the torus. The Euler characteristic of other surfaces is a useful topological invariant, which has been extended to higher dimensions using Betti numbers. In the mid nineteenth century, the Gauss–Bonnet theorem linked the Euler characteristic to the Gaussian curvature.

Lagrangian mechanics and Hamiltonian mechanics, when considered geometrically, are naturally manifold theories. All these use the notion of several characteristic axes or dimensions (known as generalized coordinates in the latter two cases), but these dimensions do not lie along the physical dimensions of width, height, and breadth.

In the early 19th century the theory of elliptic functions succeeded in giving a basis for the theory of elliptic integrals, and this left open an obvious avenue of research. The standard forms for elliptic integrals involved the square roots of cubic and quartic polynomials. When those were replaced by polynomials of higher degree, say quintics, what would happen?

In the work of Niels Henrik Abel and Carl Jacobi, the answer was formulated: the resulting integral would involve functions of two complex variables, having four independent periods (i.e. period vectors). This gave the first glimpse of an abelian variety of dimension 2 (an abelian surface): what would now be called the Jacobian of a hyperelliptic curve of genus 2.

== Riemann ==
Bernhard Riemann was the first to do extensive work generalizing the idea of a surface to higher dimensions. The name manifold comes from Riemann's original German term, Mannigfaltigkeit, which William Kingdon Clifford translated as "manifoldness". In his Göttingen inaugural lecture, Riemann described the set of all possible values of a variable with certain constraints as a Mannigfaltigkeit, because the variable can have many values. He distinguishes between stetige Mannigfaltigkeit and diskrete Mannigfaltigkeit (continuous manifoldness and discontinuous manifoldness), depending on whether the value changes continuously or not. As continuous examples, Riemann refers to not only colors and the locations of objects in space, but also the possible shapes of a spatial figure. Using induction, Riemann constructs an n-fach ausgedehnte Mannigfaltigkeit (n times extended manifoldness or n-dimensional manifoldness) as a continuous stack of (n−1) dimensional manifoldnesses. Riemann's intuitive notion of a Mannigfaltigkeit evolved into what is today formalized as a manifold. Riemannian manifolds and Riemann surfaces are named after Bernhard Riemann.

In 1857, Riemann introduced the concept of Riemann surfaces as part of a study of the process of analytic continuation; Riemann surfaces are now recognized as one-dimensional complex manifolds. He also furthered the study of abelian and other multi-variable complex functions.

== Contemporaries of Riemann ==
Johann Benedict Listing, inventor of the word "topology", wrote an 1847 paper "Vorstudien zur Topologie" in which he defined a "complex". He first defined the Möbius strip in 1861 (rediscovered four years later by Möbius), as an example of a non-orientable surface.

After Abel, Jacobi, and Riemann, some of the most important contributors to the theory of abelian functions were Weierstrass, Frobenius, Poincaré and Picard. The subject was very popular at the time, already having a large literature. By the end of the 19th century, mathematicians had begun to use geometric methods in the study of abelian functions.

== Poincaré ==
Henri Poincaré's 1895 paper Analysis Situs studied three-and-higher-dimensional manifolds (which he called "varieties"), giving rigorous definitions of homology, homotopy, and Betti numbers and raised a question, today known as the Poincaré conjecture, based his new concept of the fundamental group. In 2003, Grigori Perelman proved the conjecture using Richard S. Hamilton's Ricci flow, after nearly a century of effort by many mathematicians.

== Later developments ==
Hermann Weyl gave an intrinsic definition for differentiable manifolds in 1912. During the 1930s Hassler Whitney and others clarified the foundational aspects of the subject, and thus intuitions dating back to the latter half of the 19th century became precise, and developed through differential geometry and Lie group theory.

The Whitney embedding theorem showed that manifolds intrinsically defined by charts could always be embedded in Euclidean space, as in the extrinsic definition, showing that the two concepts of manifold were equivalent. Due to this unification, it is said to be the first complete exposition of the modern concept of manifold.

Eventually, in the 1920s, Lefschetz laid the basis for the study of abelian functions in terms of complex tori. He also appears to have been the first to use the name "abelian variety"; in Romance languages, "variety" was used to translate Riemann's term "Mannigfaltigkeit". It was Weil in the 1940s who gave this subject its modern foundations in the language of algebraic geometry.

== Sources ==
- Riemann, Bernhard, Grundlagen für eine allgemeine Theorie der Functionen einer veränderlichen complexen Grösse.
  - The 1851 doctoral thesis in which "manifold" (Mannigfaltigkeit) first appears.
- Riemann, Bernhard, On the Hypotheses which lie at the Bases of Geometry.
  - The famous Göttingen inaugural lecture (Habilitationsschrift) of 1854.
- Early history of knot theory at St-Andrews history of mathematics website
- Early history of topology at St. Andrews
- H. Lange and Ch. Birkenhake, Complex Abelian Varieties, 1992, ISBN 0-387-54747-9
  - A comprehensive treatment of the theory of abelian varieties, with an overview of the history the subject.
- André Weil: Courbes algébriques et variétés abéliennes, 1948
  - The first modern text on abelian varieties. In French.
- Henri Poincaré, Analysis Situs, Journal de l'École Polytechnique ser 2, 1 (1895) pages 1–123.
- Henri Poincaré, Complément à l'Analysis Situs, Rendiconti del Circolo Matematico di Palermo, 13 (1899) pages 285–343.
- Henri Poincaré, Second complément à l'Analysis Situs, Proceedings of the London Mathematical Society, 32 (1900), pages 277–308.
- Henri Poincaré, Sur certaines surfaces algébriques; troisième complément à l'Analysis Situs, Bulletin de la Société mathématique de France, 30 (1902), pages 49–70.
- Henri Poincaré, Sur les cycles des surfaces algébriques; quatrième complément à l'Analysis Situs, Journal de mathématiques pures et appliquées, 5° série, 8 (1902), pages 169–214.
- Henri Poincaré, Cinquième complément à l'analysis situs, Rendiconti del Circolo matematico di Palermo 18 (1904) pages 45–110.
- Erhard Scholz, Geschichte des Mannigfaltigkeitsbegriffs von Riemann bis Poincaré, Birkhäuser, 1980.
  - A study of the genesis of the manifold concept. Based on the author's dissertation, directed by Egbert Brieskorn.
