= Christopher Zeeman =

British mathematician (1925–2016)

Sir Christopher Zeeman FRS
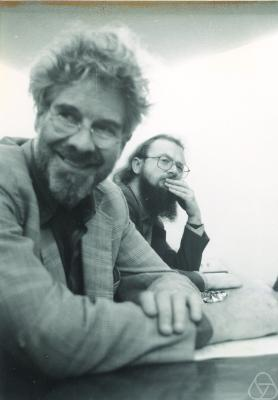
- Zeeman (in foreground) in 1980
- Born: Erik Christopher Zeeman; 4 February 1925; Yokohama, Japan
- Died: 13 February 2016 (aged 91); Woodstock, England
- Citizenship: British
- Education: Christ's College, Cambridge
- Known for: Catastrophe theory Geometric topology Singularity theory Zeeman conjecture Zeeman's comparison theorem Stallings–Zeeman theorem
- Awards: Senior Whitehead Prize (1982); Faraday Medal (1988); David Crighton Medal (2006)
- Scientific career
- Fields: Mathematics
- Workplaces: University of Cambridge; University of Warwick; University of Oxford; Gresham College
- Thesis: Dihomology (1955)
- Doctoral advisor: Shaun Wylie
- Doctoral students: Peter Buneman; David Epstein; Jenny Harrison; Ray Lickorish; Tim Poston; Colin Rourke; David Trotman; Terry Wall; Charlotte Watts

Notes
- Fellow of the Royal Society

Sir Erik Christopher Zeeman FRS (4 February 1925 – 13 February 2016) was a British mathematician known for his work in geometric topology and singularity theory.

== Overview ==
Zeeman's main contributions to mathematics were in topology, particularly in knot theory, the piecewise linear category, and dynamical systems.

His 1955 thesis at the University of Cambridge described a new theory termed "dihomology", an algebraic structure associated to a topological space, containing both homology and cohomology, introducing what is now known as the Zeeman spectral sequence. This was studied by Clint McCrory in his 1972 Brandeis thesis following a suggestion of Dennis Sullivan that one make "a general study of the Zeeman spectral sequence to see how singularities in a space perturb Poincaré duality". This in turn led to the discovery of intersection homology by Robert MacPherson and Mark Goresky at Brown University where McCrory was appointed in 1974.

From 1976 to 1977 he was the Donegall lecturer in mathematics at Trinity College Dublin.

Zeeman is known among the wider scientific public for his contribution to, and spreading awareness of catastrophe theory, which was due initially to another topologist, René Thom, and for his Christmas lectures about mathematics on television in 1978. He was especially active in encouraging the application of mathematics, and catastrophe theory in particular, to biology and behavioural sciences.

== Early life ==
Zeeman was born in Japan to a Danish father, Christian Zeeman, and a British mother. They moved to England one year after his birth. After being educated at Christ's Hospital in Horsham, West Sussex, he served as a Flying Officer with the Royal Air Force from 1943 to 1947. He studied mathematics at Christ's College, Cambridge, but had forgotten much of his school mathematics while serving in the Air Force. He received an MA and PhD (the latter under the supervision of Shaun Wylie) from the University of Cambridge, and became a Fellow of Gonville and Caius College where he tutored David Fowler and John Horton Conway.

== Academic career ==
Zeeman is one of the founders of engulfing theory in piecewise linear topology and is credited with working out the engulfing theorem (independently also worked out by John Stallings), which can be used to prove the piecewise linear version of the Poincaré conjecture for all dimensions above four.

After working at Cambridge (during which he spent a year abroad at University of Chicago and Princeton as a Harkness Fellow) and the Institut des Hautes Études Scientifiques, he founded the Mathematics Department and Mathematics Research Centre at the new University of Warwick in 1964. In his own words

I was 38 and had developed some fairly strong ideas on how to run a department and create a Mathematics Institute: I wanted to combine the flexibility of options that are common in most American universities, with the kind of tutorial care to be found in Oxford and Cambridge.

Zeeman's style of leadership was informal, but inspirational, and he rapidly took Warwick to international recognition for the quality of its mathematical research. The first six appointments he made were all in topology, enabling the department to immediately become internationally competitive, followed by six in algebra, and finally six in analysis and six in applied mathematics. He was able to trade four academic appointments for funding that enabled PhD students to give undergraduate supervision in groups of two for the first two years, in a manner similar to the tutorial system at Oxford and Cambridge. He remained at Warwick until 1988, but from 1966 to 1967 he was a visiting professor at the University of California at Berkeley, after which his research turned to dynamical systems, inspired by many of the world leaders in this field, including Stephen Smale and René Thom, who both spent time at Warwick. In 1963, Zeeman showed that causality in special relativity expressed by the preservation of partial ordering is given exactly and only by the Lorentz transforms. Zeeman subsequently spent a sabbatical with Thom at the Institut des Hautes Études Scientifiques in Bures-sur-Yvette near Paris, where he became interested in catastrophe theory. On his return to Warwick, he taught an undergraduate course in Catastrophe Theory that became immensely popular with students; his lectures generally were "standing room only". In 1973 he gave an MSc course at Warwick giving a complete detailed proof of Thom's classification of elementary catastrophes, mainly following an unpublished manuscript, "Right-equivalence" written by John Mather at Warwick in 1969. David Trotman wrote up his notes of the course as an MSc thesis. These were then distributed in thousands of copies throughout the world and published both in the proceedings of a 1975 Seattle conference on catastrophe theory and its applications, and in a 1977 collection of papers on catastrophe theory by Zeeman. In 1974 Zeeman gave an invited address at the International Congress of Mathematicians in Vancouver, about applications of catastrophe theory.

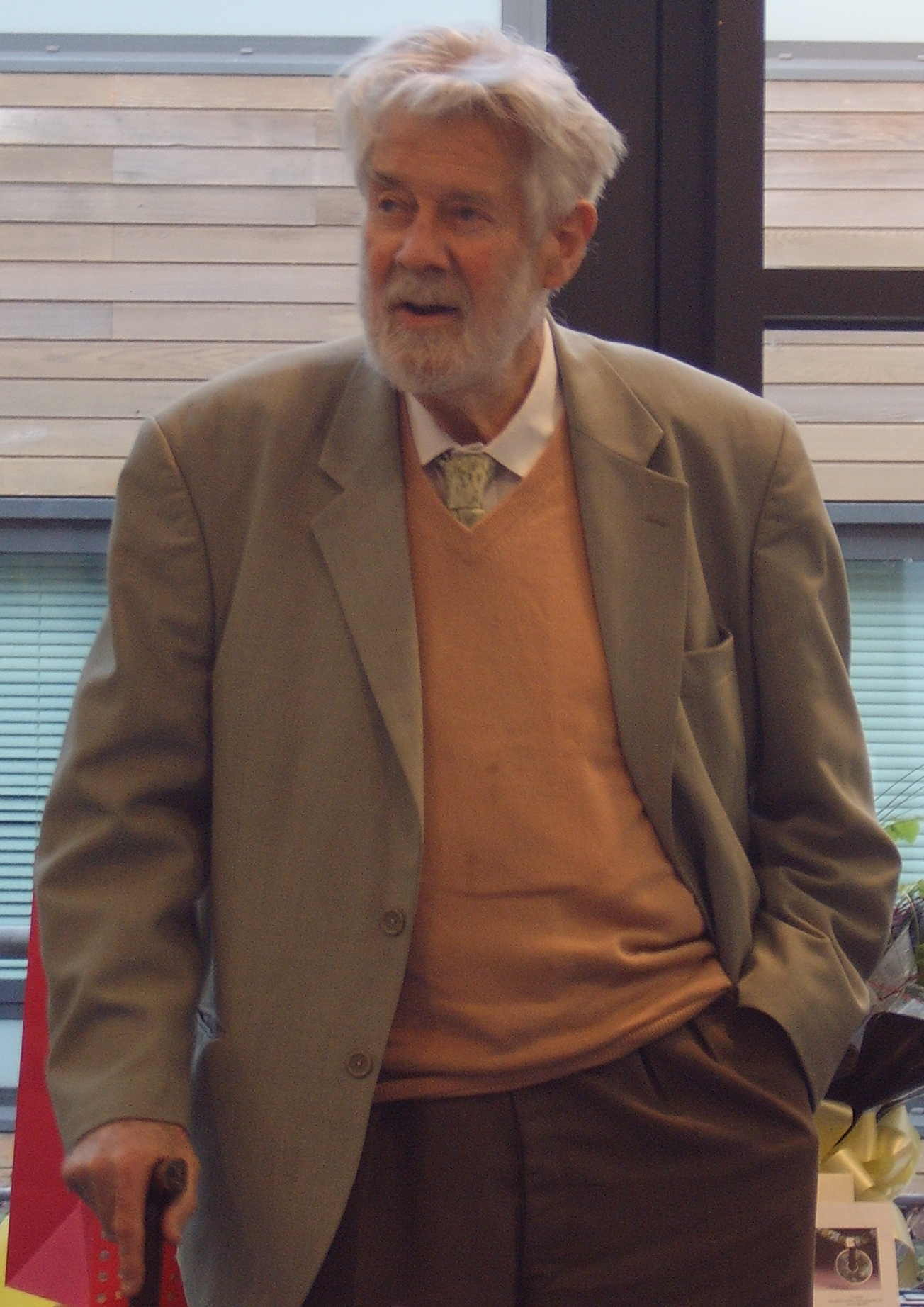
Zeeman at the Warwick Mathematics Institute in December 2009

Zeeman was elected as a Fellow of the Royal Society in 1975, and was awarded the Society's Faraday Medal in 1988. He was the 63rd President of the London Mathematical Society in 1986–88 giving his Presidential Address on 18 November 1988 On the classification of dynamical systems. He was awarded the Senior Whitehead Prize of the Society in 1982. He was the Society's first Forder lecturer, involving a lecture tour in New Zealand, in 1987. Between 1988 and 1994 he was the Professor of Geometry at Gresham College.

In 1978, Zeeman gave the televised series of Christmas Lectures at the Royal Institution. From these grew the Mathematics and Engineering Masterclasses for both primary and secondary school children that now flourish in forty centers in the United Kingdom.

In 1988, Zeeman became Principal of Hertford College, Oxford. The following year he was appointed an honorary fellow of Christ's College, Cambridge. He received a knighthood in the 1991 Birthday Honours for "mathematical excellence and service to British mathematics and mathematics education". He was invited to become President of The Mathematical Association in 2003 and based his book Three-dimensional Theorems for Schools on his 2004 Presidential Address. On Friday 6 May 2005, the University of Warwick's new Mathematics and Statistics building was named the Zeeman Building in his honour. He became an Honorary Member of The Mathematical Association in 2006. In September 2006, the London Mathematical Society and the Institute of Mathematics and its Applications awarded him the David Crighton medal in recognition of his long and distinguished service to mathematics and the mathematical community. The medal is awarded triennially, and Zeeman was the second-ever recipient of the award. He died on 13 February 2016.

== The Zeeman Medal ==
The Christopher Zeeman Medal for Communication of Mathematics of the London Mathematical Society and the Institute of Mathematics and its Applications is named in Zeeman's honour. The award aims "to honour mathematicians who have excelled in promoting mathematics and engaging with the general public. They may be academic mathematicians based in universities, mathematics school teachers, industrial mathematicians, those working in the financial sector or indeed mathematicians from any number of other fields".

== See also ==
- Mary Lou Zeeman, Zeeman's daughter, also a mathematician
- Nicolette Zeeman, Zeeman's daughter, a literary scholar

Academic offices
Preceded by Geoffrey Warnock	Principal of Hertford College, Oxford; 1988–1996	Succeeded by Walter Bodmer
