= Equisingularity =

In algebraic geometry, an equisingularity is, roughly, a family of singularities that are not non-equivalent and is an important notion in singularity theory. There is no universal definition of equisingularity but Oscar Zariski's equisingularity is the most famous one. Zariski's equisingualrity, introduced in 1971 under the name " algebro-geometric equisingularity", gives a stratification that is different from the usual Whitney stratification on a real or complex algebraic variety.

== See also ==
- stratified space
