= Ray Jayawardhana =

Astronomer

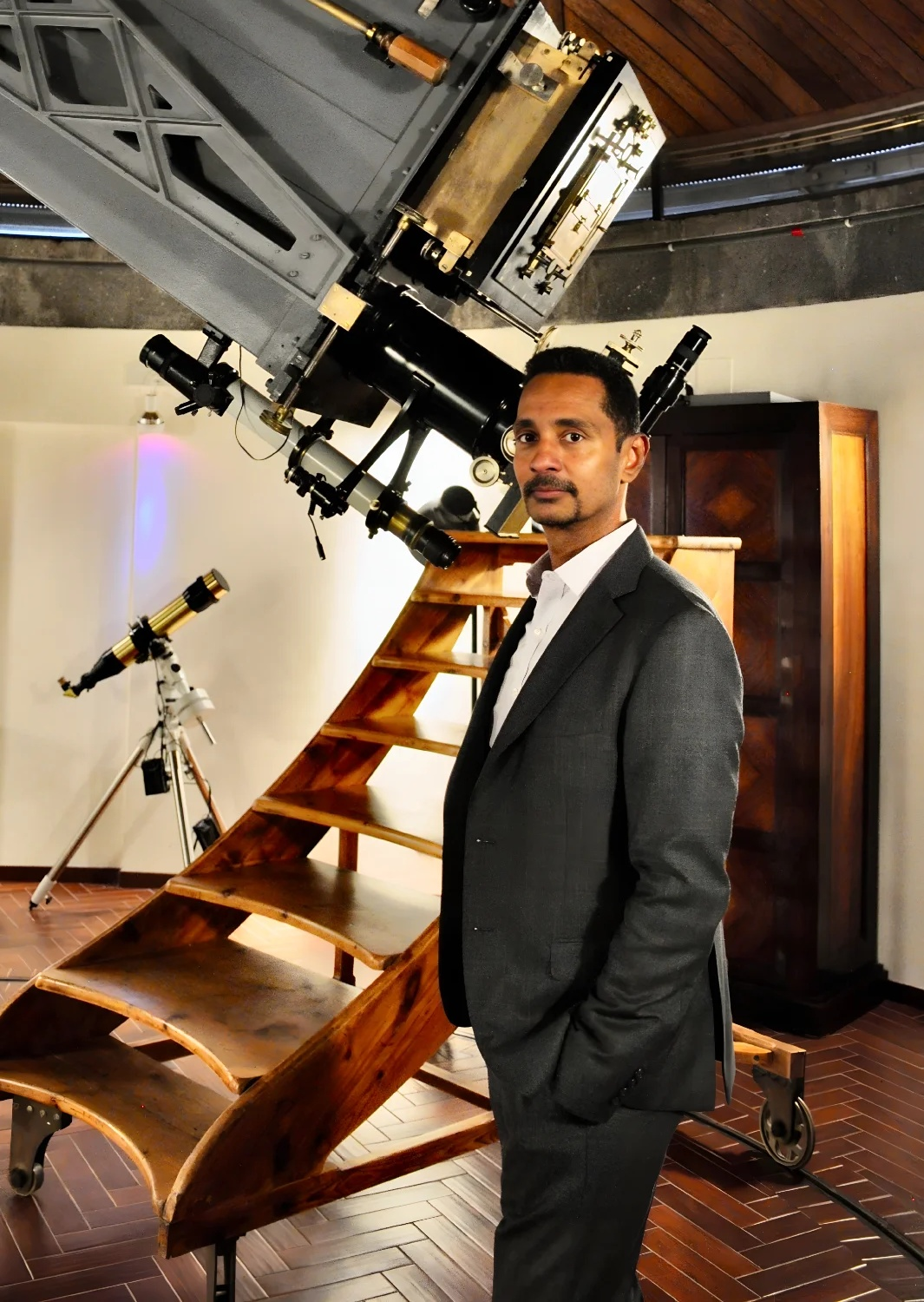

10th President of the California Institute of Technology
- Incumbent
- Assumed office July 1, 2026
- Preceded by: Thomas Rosenbaum

Personal details
- Education: Royal College, Colombo; Yale University (BS); Harvard University (PhD)
- Scientific career
- Known for: exoplanets, brown dwarfs, planet formation, star formation, popular science
- Fields: Astronomy, Astrophysics
- Doctoral advisors: Giovanni Fazio, Lee Hartmann

Ray Jayawardhana is a Sri Lankan American astrophysicist, science communicator, and the current president of the California Institute of Technology. Previously, he was the provost and professor of physics and astronomy at Johns Hopkins University, and prior to that, the Harold Tanner Dean of the College of Arts and Sciences, Professor of Astronomy, and Hans A. Bethe Professor at Cornell University.

== Early life and education ==
Jayawardhana was born in Sri Lanka, where he attended St. John's College and Royal College Colombo prior to pursuing higher education in the United States.

He received his B.S. degree from Yale University in 1994 and his Ph.D. from Harvard University in 2000.

He was a Miller Research Fellow at the University of California, Berkeley.

== Research ==
Jayawardhana's primary research areas include the characterization of exoplanets and the formation and early evolution of stars, brown dwarfs, and planetary systems. He is the co-author of more than 180 scientific papers, with over 10,000 citations.

While a graduate student at Harvard, Jayawardhana led one of the two teams that discovered a dusty disk around HR 4796, a young star, with a large inner hole, which was possibly carved out during the planet formation processes. While he was a Miller Fellow at the University of California, Berkeley, he and his collaborators discovered an edge-on protoplanetary disk in a young quadruple star system, using adaptive optics on the Gemini North telescope.

At UC Berkeley and as a faculty member at the Universities of Michigan and Toronto, Jayawardhana played a key role in establishing that young brown dwarfs undergo a T Tauri phase, similar to young Sun-like stars, with evidence for dusty disks and signatures of disk accretion and outflow. Disks have now also been found around sub-brown dwarfs or planemos. In September 2008, he and his collaborators reported the first direct image and spectroscopy of a likely extra-solar planet around a normal star. While serving as a dean at Cornell and provost at Johns Hopkins, Jayawardhana has continued to be active in research, publishing numerous papers on exoplanets and brown dwarfs using the James Webb Space Telescope and large ground-based telescopes.

He is a science team member for the James Webb Space Telescope's NIRISS instrument.

== Career ==
Jayawardhana held a Miller Research Fellowship at the University of California, Berkeley, before becoming an assistant professor at the University of Michigan. He then joined the University of Toronto, where he spent a decade on the faculty and held a Canada Research Chair. He also served as a senior advisor on science engagement to the University of Toronto president and founded the Science Leadership Program to enhance the communications and leadership skills of academic scientists. While in Toronto, he created several science outreach programs, including a public lecture series in Convocation Hall and a month-long ad campaign on the subways, streetcars and buses of the Toronto Transit Commission to mark the International Year of Astronomy.

After a stint as Dean of the Faculty of Science at York University in Toronto, during which forged a research partnership with Fermilab and launched a Science Communicator in Residence program, Jayawardhana was named the 22nd Dean of the College of Arts and Sciences at Cornell University. At Cornell, he oversaw the recruitment of more than 130 new faculty members and appointments to 66 endowed professorships. During his tenure, the college secured over $308 million in new gifts and commitments. He launched several signature initiatives, including the Klarman Fellowships for emerging researchers and the Nexus Scholars undergraduate research program, and led the $110 million renewal of McGraw Hall. He also played a key role in establishing Cornell's Brooks School of Public Policy and co-led university-wide initiatives on climate, artificial intelligence, and quantum research.

From 2023 to 2026, Jayawardhana has served as the 16th provost of Johns Hopkins University . He is also a professor of Physics and Astronomy. As provost, he has led or overseen the development of numerous major university initiatives, including the establishment of the Data Science and AI Institute, launch of the School of Government and Policy, expansion of the Bloomberg Distinguished Professorships program, development of the HopGPT AI portal, the Provost's Fellows for Public Engagement program, and the Office of the Arts.

On 6 January 2026, Jayawardhana was named as the next president of the California Institute of Technology (Caltech), effective 1 July 2026.

Jayawardhana serves on the Board of Trustees of the Alfred P. Sloan Foundation.

== Honors ==
- Science Writing Award of the American Institute of Physics (2003)
- Canada Research Chair in Observational Astrophysics (2008)
- E.W.R. Steacie Memorial Fellowship (2009) awarded to enhance the career development of outstanding and highly promising university faculty who are earning a strong international reputation for original research, from the Natural Sciences and Engineering Research Council of Canada, presented by Prime Minister Stephen Harper at a ceremony in Ottawa on March 16, 2009.
- Canada's "Top 40 Under 40" (2009)
- Radcliffe Fellowship at Harvard University (2011–12)
- Rutherford Memorial Medal of the Royal Society of Canada (2013)
- Book Award of the Science Writers & Communicators of Canada (2013)
- Guggenheim Fellowship (2014)
- Selby Fellowship of the Australian Academy of Science (2015)
- Dwight Nicholson Medal of the American Physical Society (2018)
- Carl Sagan Medal (2020)
- Rockefeller Foundation Bellagio Residency (2023)
- The Main-belt asteroid 4668 Rayjay is named after him.

== Bibliography ==
=== Books ===
- Star Factories: The Birth of Stars and Planets (2000), Heinemann/Raintree, ISBN 9780739822227
- Young Stars near Earth: Progress and Prospects, editors: Ray Jayawardhana and Thomas P. Greene, (2001), Astronomical Society of the Pacific, ISBN 9781583815809
- Star Formation at High Angular Resolution, editors: Michael Burton, Ray Jayawardhana and Tyler Bourke, (2004), Astronomical Society of the Pacific, ISBN 9781583811610
- Strange New Worlds: The Search for Alien Planets and Life beyond Our Solar System (2011), Princeton University Press, ISBN 9780691158075
- Neutrino Hunters: The Thrilling Chase for a Ghostly Particle to Unlock the Secrets of the Universe (2013), Farrar, Straus and Giroux, ISBN 9780374535216
- Child of the Universe (2020), Penguin Random House, ISBN 9781524717544
