= David Fowler =

David Fowler may refer to:

- David Fowler (physicist) (born 1950), environmental physicist and air pollution scientist
- David Fowler (politician) (born 1958), member of the Tennessee Senate
- David Fowler (mathematician) (1937–2004), British historian of Greek mathematics
- David Fowler (merchant) (1826–1881), Scottish born wholesale grocer in Australia, co-founder of D. & J. Fowler Ltd.
- A prominent witness in the 2021 Trial of Derek Chauvin
