= Jenny Harrison =

American mathematician

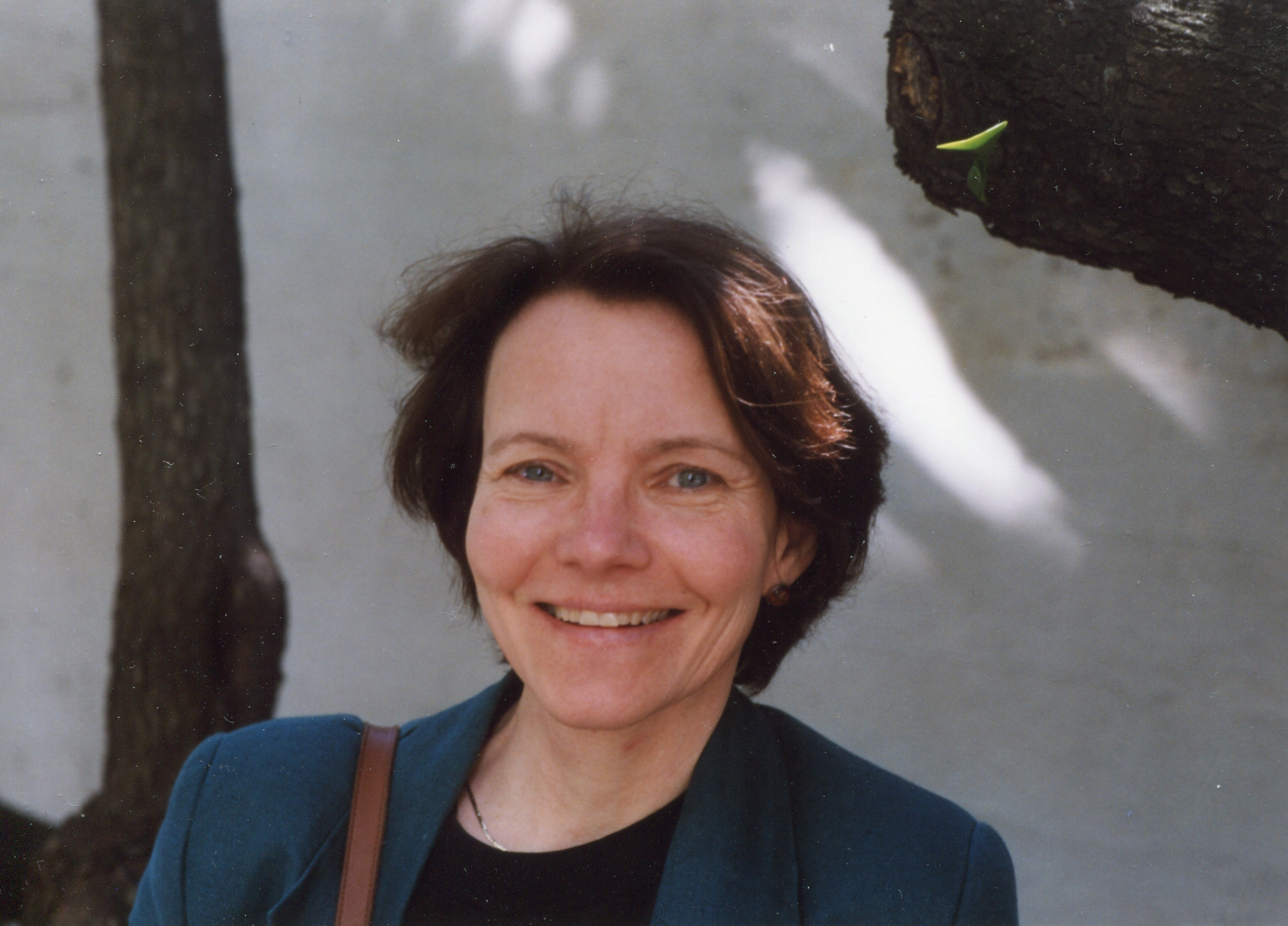
- Born: Atlanta, Georgia, US
- Education: University of Alabama (BA); University of Warwick (PhD)
- Known for: Contributions to geometric analysis, chainlets, Plateau's problem
- Awards: Marshall Scholarship
- Scientific career
- Fields: Mathematics
- Institutions: University of California, Berkeley
- Thesis: (1975)
- Doctoral advisor: Christopher Zeeman

Jenny Harrison is an American mathematician and professor of mathematics at the University of California, Berkeley. Her research interests include geometric analysis and the intersection of algebra and geometric measure theory.

== Education and early career ==
Harrison grew up in Tuscaloosa, Alabama, and earned her undergraduate degree from the University of Alabama. Awarded a Marshall Scholarship, she pursued her graduate studies at the University of Warwick. While at Warwick, Harrison produced a counterexample to a conjecture of Arnaud Denjoy (a similar one was discovered independently by Charles Fefferman and William Thurston) which was published in the Annals of Mathematics in 1975. She completed her PhD that same year under the supervision of Christopher Zeeman.

Hassler Whitney served as Harrison's postdoctoral adviser at the Institute for Advanced Study (1975–1976), and she was later a Miller Research Fellow at the University of California, Berkeley. She served on the faculty at the University of Oxford and was a Fellow of Somerville College from 1978 to 1981, before returning to Berkeley as an assistant professor.

In 1986, after being denied tenure at Berkeley, Harrison filed a lawsuit alleging gender discrimination. The case drew national attention within the American academic community. A 1993 settlement led to a new review of her research by an independent panel of seven mathematicians and scientists, who recommended her promotion to full professor.

== Research ==
Harrison specializes in geometric analysis. She developed a theory of differential chains, a framework that unifies infinitesimal calculus with the classical theory of the smooth continuum. Her work in this area provides methods that apply to domains including soap films, fractals, and Whitney stratified spaces.

Her research includes applications to the calculus of variations and continuum mechanics. She has notably worked on Plateau's problem, providing proofs regarding the existence of solutions for boundary curves that account for various soap film structures found in nature. She also extended the divergence theorem (Gauss–Green theorem) to apply to fractal boundaries. This work builds upon and generalizes previous solutions by Jesse Douglas, Herbert Federer, and Wendell Fleming.

== Awards and fellowships ==
- Foundational Questions Institute (FQXi) Research Award, 2009
- Miller Professor, Miller Institute for Basic Research in Science, 2007
- Visiting Research Professor, Rockefeller University, 1996–97
- National Science Foundation Visiting Scholar, Yale University, 1989–90
- CUF Lecturer and Tutorial Fellow, Somerville College, Oxford, 1978–81
- Miller Fellow, University of California, Berkeley, 1977–78
- Visiting Fellow, Institute for Advanced Study, Princeton, 1975–76
