= Whitney embedding theorem =

Theorem in differential topology

In mathematics, particularly in differential topology, there are two Whitney embedding theorems, named after Hassler Whitney:

- The strong Whitney embedding theorem states that any smooth real m-dimensional manifold (required also to be Hausdorff and second-countable) can be smoothly embedded in the real 2m-space, $\R^{2m},$ if m > 0. This is the best linear bound on the smallest-dimensional Euclidean space that all m-dimensional manifolds embed in, as the real projective spaces of dimension m cannot be embedded into real (2m − 1)-space if m is a power of two (as can be seen from a characteristic class argument, also due to Whitney).
- The weak Whitney embedding theorem states that any continuous function from an n-dimensional manifold to an m-dimensional manifold may be approximated by a smooth embedding provided m > 2n. Whitney similarly proved that such a map could be approximated by an immersion provided m > 2n − 1. This last result is sometimes called the Whitney immersion theorem.

== About the proof ==
=== Weak embedding theorem ===
The weak Whitney embedding is proved through a projection argument.

When the manifold is compact, one can first use a covering by finitely many local charts and then reduce the dimension with suitable projections.

=== Strong embedding theorem ===
The general outline of the proof is to start with an immersion $f:M \to \R^{2m}$ with transverse self-intersections. These are known to exist from Whitney's earlier work on the weak immersion theorem. Transversality of the double points follows from a general-position argument. The idea is to then somehow remove all the self-intersections. If M has boundary, one can remove the self-intersections simply by isotoping M into itself (the isotopy being in the domain of f), to a submanifold of M that does not contain the double-points. Thus, we are quickly led to the case where M has no boundary. Sometimes it is impossible to remove the double-points via an isotopy—consider for example the figure-8 immersion of the circle in the plane. In this case, one needs to introduce a local double point.

Introducing double-point.

Once one has two opposite double points, one constructs a closed loop connecting the two, giving a closed path in $\R^{2m}.$ Since $\R^{2m}$ is simply connected, one can assume this path bounds a disc, and provided 2m > 4 one can further assume (by the weak Whitney embedding theorem) that the disc is embedded in $\R^{2m}$ such that it intersects the image of M only in its boundary. Whitney then uses the disc to create a 1-parameter family of immersions, in effect pushing M across the disc, removing the two double points in the process. In the case of the figure-8 immersion with its introduced double-point, the push across move is quite simple (pictured).

Cancelling opposite double-points.

This process of eliminating opposite sign double-points by pushing the manifold along a disc is called the Whitney Trick.

To introduce a local double point, Whitney created immersions $\alpha_m: \R^m \to \R^{2m}$ which are approximately linear outside of the unit ball, but containing a single double point. For m = 1 such an immersion is given by

$$\begin{cases}
\alpha : \R^1 \to \R^2 \\
\alpha(t)=\left(\frac{1}{1+t^2},\ t - \frac{2t}{1+t^2}\right)
\end{cases}$$

Notice that if α is considered as a map to $\R^3$ like so:

$$\alpha(t) = \left( \frac{1}{1+t^2},\ t - \frac{2t}{1+t^2},0\right)$$

then the double point can be resolved to an embedding:

$$\beta(t,a) = \left(\frac{1}{(1+t^2)(1+a^2)},\ t - \frac{2t}{(1+t^2)(1+a^2)},\ \frac{ta}{(1+t^2)(1+a^2)}\right).$$

Notice β(t, 0) = α(t) and for a ≠ 0 then as a function of t, β(t, a) is an embedding.

For higher dimensions m, there are α_{m} that can be similarly resolved in $\R^{2m+1}.$ For an embedding into $\R^5,$ for example, define

$$\alpha_2(t_1,t_2) = \left(\beta(t_1,t_2),\ t_2\right) =  \left(\frac{1}{(1+t_1^2)(1+t_2^2)},\ t_1 - \frac{2t_1}{(1+t_1^2)(1+t_2^2)},\ \frac{t_1t_2}{(1+t_1^2)(1+t_2^2)},\ t_2 \right).$$

This process ultimately leads one to the definition:

$$\alpha_m(t_1,t_2,\cdots,t_m) = \left(\frac{1}{u},t_1 - \frac{2t_1}{u},  \frac{t_1t_2}{u}, t_2, \frac{t_1t_3}{u}, t_3, \cdots, \frac{t_1t_m}{u}, t_m \right),$$

where

$$u=(1+t_1^2)(1+t_2^2)\cdots(1+t_m^2).$$

The key properties of α_{m} is that it is an embedding except for the double-point α_{m}(1, 0, ... , 0) = α_{m}(−1, 0, ... , 0). Moreover, for |(t_{1}, ... , t_{m})| large, it is approximately the linear embedding (0, t_{1}, 0, t_{2}, ... , 0, t_{m}).

=== Eventual consequences of the Whitney trick ===
The Whitney trick was used by Stephen Smale to prove the h-cobordism theorem; from which follows the Poincaré conjecture in dimensions m ≥ 5, and the classification of smooth structures on discs (also in dimensions 5 and up). This provides the foundation for surgery theory, which classifies manifolds in dimension 5 and above.

Given two oriented submanifolds of complementary dimensions in a simply connected manifold of dimension ≥ 5, one can apply an isotopy to one of the submanifolds so that all the points of intersection have the same sign.

== History ==
The occasion of the proof by Hassler Whitney of the embedding theorem for smooth manifolds is said (rather surprisingly) to have been the first complete exposition of the manifold concept precisely because it brought together and unified the differing concepts of manifolds at the time: no longer was there any confusion as to whether abstract manifolds, intrinsically defined via charts, were any more or less general than manifolds extrinsically defined as submanifolds of Euclidean space. See also the history of manifolds and varieties for context.

== Sharper results ==
Although every n-manifold embeds in $\R^{2n},$ one can frequently do better. Let e(n) denote the smallest integer so that all compact connected n-manifolds embed in $\R^{e(n)}.$ Whitney's strong embedding theorem states that e(n) ≤ 2n. For n = 1, 2 we have e(n) = 2n, as the circle and the Klein bottle show. More generally, for n = 2^{k} we have e(n) = 2n, as the 2^{k}-dimensional real projective space show. Whitney's result can be improved to e(n) ≤ 2n − 1 unless n is a power of 2. This is a result of André Haefliger and Morris Hirsch (for n > 4) and C. T. C. Wall (for n = 3); these authors used important preliminary results and particular cases proved by Hirsch, William S. Massey, Sergey Novikov and Vladimir Rokhlin. At present the function e is not known in closed-form for all integers (compare to the Whitney immersion theorem, where the analogous number is known).

=== Restrictions on manifolds ===
One can strengthen the results by putting additional restrictions on the manifold. For example, the n-sphere always embeds in $\R^{n+1}$ – which is the best possible (closed n-manifolds cannot embed in $\R^n$). Any compact orientable surface and any compact surface with non-empty boundary embeds in $\R^3,$ though any closed non-orientable surface needs $\R^4.$

If N is a compact orientable n-dimensional manifold, then N embeds in $\R^{2n-1}$ (for n not a power of 2 the orientability condition is superfluous). For n a power of 2 this is a result of André Haefliger and Morris Hirsch (for n > 4), and Fuquan Fang (for n = 4); these authors used important preliminary results proved by Jacques Boéchat and Haefliger, Simon Donaldson, Hirsch and William S. Massey. Haefliger proved that if N is a compact n-dimensional k-connected manifold, then N embeds in $\R^{2n-k}$ provided 2k + 3 ≤ n.

== Isotopy versions ==
A relatively 'easy' result is to prove that any two embeddings of a 1-manifold into $\R^4$ are isotopic (see Knot theory#Higher dimensions). This is proved using general position, which also allows to show that any two embeddings of an n-manifold into $\R^{2n+2}$ are isotopic. This result is an isotopy version of the weak Whitney embedding theorem.

Wu proved that for n ≥ 2, any two embeddings of an n-manifold into $\R^{2n+1}$ are isotopic. This result is an isotopy version of the strong Whitney embedding theorem.

As an isotopy version of his embedding result, Haefliger proved that if N is a compact n-dimensional k-connected manifold, then any two embeddings of N into $\R^{2n-k+1}$ are isotopic provided 2k + 2 ≤ n. The dimension restriction 2k + 2 ≤ n is sharp: Haefliger went on to give examples of non-trivially embedded 3-spheres in $\R^6$ (and, more generally, (2d − 1)-spheres in $\R^{3d}$). See further generalizations.

== See also ==
- Representation theorem – Proof that every structure with certain properties is isomorphic to another structure
- Whitney immersion theorem – Theorem in differential topology
- Nash embedding theorem – Every Riemannian manifold can be isometrically embedded into some Euclidean space
- Takens's theorem – Conditions under which a chaotic system can be reconstructed by observation
- Nonlinear dimensionality reduction – Projection of data onto lower-dimensional manifolds
- Universal space
