= Thom's first isotopy lemma =

Theorem

In mathematics, especially in differential topology, Thom's first isotopy lemma states: given a smooth map $f : M \to N$ between smooth manifolds and $S \subset M$ a closed Whitney stratified subset, if $f|_S$ is proper and $f|_A$ is a submersion for each stratum $A$ of $S$, then $f|_S$ is a locally trivial fibration. The lemma was originally introduced by René Thom who considered the case when $N = \mathbb{R}$. In that case, the lemma constructs an isotopy from the fiber $f^{-1}(a)$ to $f^{-1}(b)$; whence the name "isotopy lemma".

The local trivializations that the lemma provide preserve the strata. However, they are generally not smooth (not even $C^1$). On the other hand, it is possible that local trivializations are semialgebraic if the input data is semialgebraic.

The lemma is also valid for a more general stratified space such as a stratified space in the sense of Mather but still with the Whitney conditions (or some other conditions). The lemma is also valid for the stratification that satisfies Bekka's condition (C), which is weaker than Whitney's condition (B). (The significance of this is that the consequences of the first isotopy lemma cannot imply Whitney’s condition (B).)

Thom's second isotopy lemma is a family version of the first isotopy lemma.

== Proof ==
The proof is based on the notion of a controlled vector field. Let $\{ (T_A, \pi_A, \rho_A) \mid A \}$ be a system of tubular neighborhoods $T_A$ in $M$ of strata $A$ in $S$ where $\pi_A : T_A \to A$ is the associated projection and $\rho_A : T_A \to [0, \infty)$ given by the square norm on each fiber of $\pi_A$. (The construction of such a system relies on the Whitney conditions or something weaker.) By definition, a controlled vector field is a family of vector fields (smooth of some class) $\eta_A$ on the strata $A$ such that: for each stratum A, there exists a neighborhood $T'_A$ of $A$ in $T_A$ such that for any $B > A$,

$$\eta_B \circ \rho_A = 0,$$
$$(\pi_A)_* \eta_B = \eta_A \circ \pi_A$$

on $T_A' \cap B$.

Assume the system $T_A$ is compatible with the map $f : M \to N$ (such a system exists). Then there are two key results due to Thom:

1. Given a vector field $\zeta$ on N, there exists a controlled vector field $\eta$ on S that is a lift of it: $f_* (\eta) = \zeta \circ f$.
2. A controlled vector field has a continuous flow (despite the fact that a controlled vector field is discontinuous).

The lemma now follows in a straightforward fashion. Since the statement is local, assume $N = \mathbb{R}^n$ and $\partial_i$ the coordinate vector fields on $\mathbb{R}^n$. Then, by the lifting result, we find controlled vector fields $\widetilde{\partial_i}$ on $S$ such that $f_*(\widetilde{\partial_i}) = \partial_i \circ f$. Let $\varphi_i : \mathbb{R} \times S \to S$ be the flows associated to them. Then define

$$H : f|_S^{-1}(0) \times \mathbb{R}^n \to S$$

by

$$H(y, t) = \varphi_n(t_n, \phi_{n-1}(t_{n-1}, \cdots, \varphi_1(t_1, y) \cdots)).$$

It is a map over $\mathbb{R}^n$ and is a homeomorphism since $G(x) = (\varphi_1(-t_1, \cdots, \varphi_n(-t_n, x) \cdots), t), t = f(x)$ is the inverse. Since the flows $\varphi_i$ preserve the strata, $H$ also preserves the strata. $\square$

== See also ==
- Ehresmann's fibration theorem
- Thom–Mather stratified space
- Tame topology
