= Wall theorems =

Results in differential topology

In differential topology in mathematics, the Wall theorems are four results, which connect the smooth structure, auto-diffeomorphisms and the intersection form of a smooth 4-manifold with h-cobordisms, stable diffeomorphisms and induced form automorphisms. The theorems are named after C. T. C. Wall, who proved them in 1964.

== Wall's theorem on h-cobordisms ==
Wall's theorem on h-cobordisms claims, that simply connected closed smooth 4-manifolds with isomorphic intersection form are even h-cobordant.

== Wall's theorem on stabilization ==
Wall's theorem on stabilization claims, that for h-cobordant simply connected closed smooth 4-manifolds $M$ and $N$, there exists a natural number $n\in\mathbb{N}$ and a diffeomorphism $M\#n(S^2\times S^2)\cong N\#n(S^2\times S^2)$. Becoming diffeomorphic after connected sums with $S^2\times S^2$ is also called stably diffeomorphic. A combination with Wall's theorem on h-cobordisms yields that simply connected smooth 4-manifolds with isomorphic intersection form are even stably diffeomorphic.

Since both the classification of smooth structures on 4-manifolds and the existence of exotic 4-spheres are important open problems in differential topology, it seems that a connection could exist using connected sums with exotic 4-spheres. However, if $\Sigma$ is an exotic 4-sphere, then Wall's theorem on stabilization guarantees the existence of a natural number $n\in\mathbb{N}$ and a diffeomorphism:

$$\Sigma\#n(S^2\times S^2)
\cong S^4\#n(S^2\times S^2)
\cong n(S^2\times S^2),$$

meaning that the connected sum with $\Sigma$ causes no change in the smooth structure.

== Wall's theorem on automorphisms ==
Wall's theorem on automorphisms claims, that for a symmetric unimodular bilinear form $Q\colon\mathbb{Z}^n\times\mathbb{Z}^n\rightarrow\mathbb{Z}$ with $\operatorname{rk}(Q)-|\sigma(Q)|\geq 4$ and two elements $x,y\in\mathbb{Z}$ with same divisibility, self-intersection $Q(x,x)=Q(y,y)$ and type, there exists an automorphism $f\colon\mathbb{Z}^n\rightarrow\mathbb{Z}^n$ with $f(x)=y$.

Divisibility is the largest integer able to divide the element. Type refers to whether the element is characteristic or not. $\operatorname{rk}(Q)-|\sigma(Q)|$ is always even, hence the above condition only excludes definite forms with $\operatorname{rk}(Q)-|\sigma(Q)|=0$ and near-definite forms with $\operatorname{rk}(Q)-|\sigma(Q)|=2$. According to Serre's classification, this includes only the hyperbolic form
$$H=Q_{S^2\times S^2}
=\begin{pmatrix}
0 & 1 \\
1 & 0
\end{pmatrix}$$
as well as $[+1]\oplus n[-1]$ and $n[+1]\oplus[-1]$.

== Wall's theorem on diffeomorphisms ==
Wall's theorem on diffeomorphisms claims, that for a simply connected smooth 4-manifold $M$ with indefinite intersection form $Q_M$, every automorphism of $Q_{M\#(S^2\times S^2)} \cong Q_M\oplus H$ (with the hyperbolic form
$$H=Q_{S^2\times S^2}
=\begin{pmatrix}
0 & 1 \\
1 & 0
\end{pmatrix}$$
) comes from a self-diffeomorphism on $M\#(S^2\times S^2)$. This shows an important difference between smooth and topological 4-manifolds since the latter require no stabilization. For a simply connected topological 4-manifold $M$ with indefinite intersection form $Q_M$, every automorphism of $Q_M$ comes from a self-homeomorphism on $M$.

== Literature ==
- Wall, C. T. C. (1964). "Diffeomorphisms of 4-Manifolds". Journal of the London Mathematical Society (1): 131–140. doi:10.1112/jlms/s1-39.1.131.
- Wall, C. T. C. (1964). "On simply-connected 4-manifolds". Journal of the London Mathematical Society (1): 141–149. doi:10.1112/jlms/s1-39.1.141.
- Scorpan, Alexandru (2005). The Wild World of 4-Manifolds. Mathematical Sciences Research Institute Publications. Vol. 1. American Mathematical Society. ISBN 978-1-4704-6861-3.
