= Brauer–Wall group =

In mathematics, the Brauer–Wall group or super Brauer group or graded Brauer group for a field F is a group BW(F) classifying finite-dimensional graded central division algebras over the field. It was first defined by Terry Wall (1964) as a generalization of the Brauer group.

The Brauer group of a field F is the set of the similarity classes of finite-dimensional central simple algebras over F under the operation of tensor product, where two algebras are called similar if the commutants of their simple modules are isomorphic. Every similarity class contains a unique division algebra, so the elements of the Brauer group can also be identified with isomorphism classes of finite-dimensional central division algebras. The analogous construction for Z/2Z-graded algebras defines the Brauer–Wall group BW(F).

== Properties ==
- The Brauer group B(F) injects into BW(F) by mapping a CSA A to the graded algebra which is A in grade zero.
- Wall (1964, theorem 3) showed that there is an exact sequence

0 → B(F) → BW(F) → Q(F) → 0

where Q(F) is the group of graded quadratic extensions of F, defined as an extension of Z/2 by F^{*}/F^{*2} with multiplication (e,x)(f,y) = (e + f, (−1)^{ef}xy). The map from BW(F) to Q(F) is the Clifford invariant defined by mapping an algebra to the pair consisting of its grade and determinant.

- There is a map from the additive group of the Witt–Grothendieck ring to the Brauer–Wall group obtained by sending a quadratic space to its Clifford algebra. The map factors through the Witt group, which has kernel I^{3}, where I is the fundamental ideal of W(F).

== Examples ==
- BW(C) is isomorphic to Z/2Z. This is an algebraic aspect of Bott periodicity of period 2 for the unitary group. The 2 super division algebras are C, C[γ] where γ is an odd element of square 1 commuting with C.
- BW(R) is isomorphic to Z/8Z. This is an algebraic aspect of Bott periodicity of period 8 for the orthogonal group. The 8 super division algebras are R, R[ε], C[ε], H[δ], H, H[ε], C[δ], R[δ] where δ and ε are odd elements of square −1 and 1, such that conjugation by them on complex numbers is complex conjugation.
