= Splitting lemma (functions) =

In mathematics, especially in singularity theory, the splitting lemma is a useful result due to René Thom which provides a way of simplifying the local expression of a function usually applied in a neighbourhood of a degenerate critical point.

== Formal statement ==
Let $f:(\mathbb{R}^n, 0) \to (\mathbb{R}, 0)$ be a smooth function germ, with a critical point at 0 (so $(\partial f/\partial x_i)(0) = 0$ for $i = 1, \dots, n$). Let V be a subspace of $\mathbb{R}^n$ such that the restriction f |_{V} is non-degenerate, and write B for the Hessian matrix of this restriction. Let W be any complementary subspace to V. Then there is a change of coordinates $\Phi(x, y)$ of the form $\Phi(x, y) = (\phi(x, y), y)$ with $x \in V, y \in W$, and a smooth function h on W such that

$$f\circ\Phi(x,y) = \frac{1}{2} x^TBx + h(y).$$

This result is often referred to as the parametrized Morse lemma, which can be seen by viewing y as the parameter. It is the gradient version of the implicit function theorem.

== Extensions ==
There are extensions to infinite dimensions, to complex analytic functions, to functions invariant under the action of a compact group, ...
