= Whitney immersion theorem =

Theorem in differential topology

In differential topology, the Whitney immersion theorem (named after Hassler Whitney) states that for $m>1$, any smooth $m$-dimensional manifold (required also to be Hausdorff and second-countable) has a one-to-one immersion in Euclidean $2m$-space, and a (not necessarily one-to-one) immersion in $(2m-1)$-space. Similarly, every smooth $m$-dimensional manifold can be immersed in the $2m-1$-dimensional sphere (this removes the $m>1$ constraint).

The weak version, for $2m+1$, is due to transversality (general position, dimension counting): two m-dimensional manifolds in $\mathbf{R}^{2m}$ intersect generically in a 0-dimensional space.

== Further results ==
William S. Massey (Massey 1960) went on to prove that every n-dimensional manifold is cobordant to a manifold that immerses in $S^{2n-a(n)}$ where $a(n)$ is the number of 1's that appear in the binary expansion of $n$. (The corresponding dimensions are listed in OEIS: A005187). In the same paper, Massey proved that for every n there is manifold (which happens to be a product of real projective spaces) that does not immerse in $S^{2n-1-a(n)}$.

The conjecture that every n-manifold immerses in $S^{2n-a(n)}$ became known as the immersion conjecture. This conjecture was eventually solved in the affirmative by Ralph Cohen (1985).

== See also ==
- Whitney embedding theorem
