= Richard Eliot Chamberlin =

American mathematician (1923–1994)

Richard Eliot Chamberlin (March 20, 1923 – March 14, 1994) was an American mathematician, specializing in geometric topology.

== Biography ==
Chamberlin was born on March 20, 1923, in Cambridge, Massachusetts. His father was Ralph Vary Chamberlin. Eliot Chamberlin attended East High School in Salt Lake City. He received his bachelor's degree from the University of Utah. In the early 1940s, he was a teaching fellow in physics at the University of Utah and then the Massachusetts Institute of Technology. After serving as an instructor of physics at Northeastern University, he served two years in the United States Navy during World War II. After discharge from the Navy, he entered graduate school in mathematics at Harvard University, and received his Ph.D. in 1950 with thesis supervisor Hassler Whitney.

Chamberlin joined the faculty of the mathematics department at the University of Utah in 1949 and retired there as professor emeritus on July 1, 1988. Chamberlin gave an invited address at the International Congress of Mathematicians in 1950 in Cambridge, Massachusetts.

== Selected publications ==
- Chamberlin, Richard Eliot; Wolfe, Jr., James Harold (1953). "Multiplicative homomorphisms of matrices". Proceedings of the American Mathematical Society. 4 (1): 37–42. doi:10.2307/2032198. JSTOR 2032198. MR 0052382.
- Chamberlin, Richard Eliot; Wolfe, Jr., James Harold (1954). "Note on a converse of Lucas's theorem". Proceedings of the American Mathematical Society. 5 (2): 203–205. doi:10.2307/2032224. JSTOR 2032224. MR 0061207.
- Chamberlin, Richard Eliot (1959). "A class of unknotted curves in 3-space". Proceedings of the American Mathematical Society. 10 (1): 149–157. doi:10.2307/2032904. JSTOR 2032904. MR 0100270.
- Chamberlin, Richard Eliot; Case, James Hughson (1960). "Characterizations of tree-like continua". Pacific Journal of Mathematics. 10 (1): 73–84. doi:10.2140/pjm.1960.10.73. MR 0111000.
