= J. W. Bruce =

British mathematician

Bill Bruce
- Education: University of Liverpool
- Scientific career
- Fields: Singularity Theory
- Workplaces: University of Liverpool; Institut des Hautes Etudes Scientifiques; University College Cork; University of Newcastle; Mount Holyoke College; University of Hull; Edge Hill University
- Doctoral advisor: C. T. C. Wall

James William "Bill" Bruce (born 11 January 1952) is a British mathematician whose main contributions are in singularity theory and related areas.

== Mathematical career ==
Bill completed his PhD thesis, titled Some Natural Whitney Stratifications, in 1978 at the University of Liverpool under the supervision of C T C Wall. Following domestic and international appointments, he was appointed to a chair in pure mathematics at the University of Liverpool in 1990.

== Administrative career ==
Whilst at the University of Liverpool, Bill served as head of mathematics for eight years. He then became Pro Vice-Chancellor with responsibility for the academic budget and learning and teaching, before joining the University of Hull as Deputy Vice-Chancellor in 2004. In 2009 he joined Edge Hill University as Pro Vice-Chancellor with responsibility for the university's academic portfolio.
