= Structural fracture mechanics =

Field of structural engineering

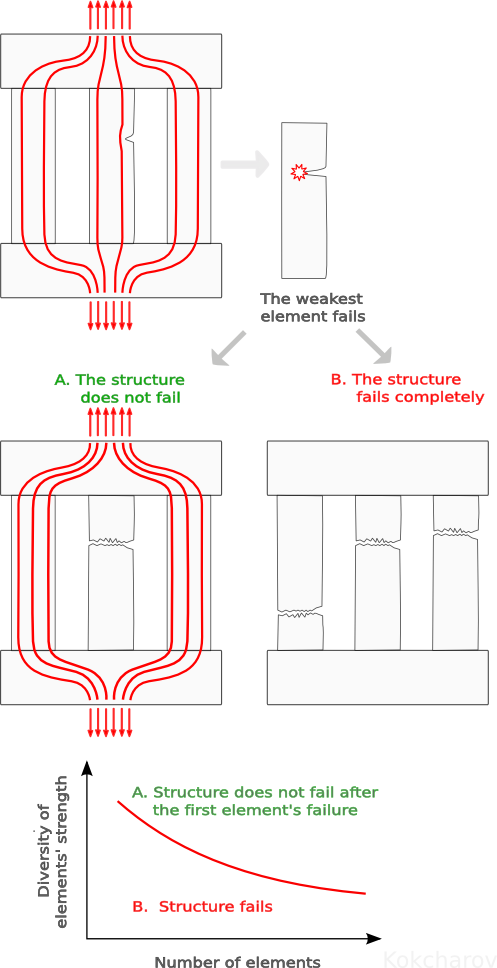
Model of structural fracture mechanics.

Structural fracture mechanics is the field of structural engineering concerned with the study of load-carrying structures that includes one or several failed or damaged components. It uses methods of analytical solid mechanics, structural engineering, safety engineering, probability theory, and catastrophe theory to calculate the load and stress in the structural components and analyze the safety of a damaged structure.

There is a direct analogy between fracture mechanics of solid and structural fracture mechanics:

Analogy between fracture mechanics of solid and structural fracture mechanics
	Fracture mechanics	Structural fracture mechanics
Model	Solid with a crack	Multi-component structure with a failed component
Defect driving force	Stress intensity factor	Overload stress
System property	Fracture toughness	Reserve ability / Structural robustness

There are different causes of the first component failure:

1. mechanical overload, fatigue (material), unpredicted scenario, etc.
2. “human intervention” like unprofessional behavior or a terrorist attack.

There are two typical scenarios:

1. A localized failure does NOT cause immediate collapse of the entire structure.
2. The entire structure fails immediately after one of its components fails.

If the structure does not collapse immediately there is a limited period of time until the catastrophic structural failure of the entire structure. There is a critical number of structural elements that defines whether the system has reserve ability or not.

Safety engineers use the failure of the first component as an indicator and try to intervene during the given period of time to avoid the catastrophe of the entire structure. For example, “Leak-Before-Break” methodology means that a leak will be discovered prior to a catastrophic failure of the entire piping system occurring in service. It has been applied to pressure vessels, nuclear piping, gas and oil pipelines, etc.

The methods of structural fracture mechanics are used as checking calculations to estimate sensitivity of a structure to its component failure.

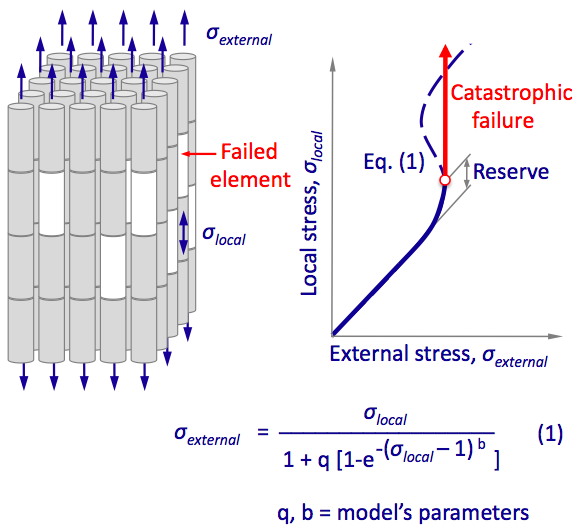
Catastrophe failure model and reserve ability of a complex system. The model supposes that failure of several elements causes neighboring elements overloading. The model equation shows the relationship between local and external stresses. The equation is similar to the cusp catastrophe behavior. The theory predicts reserve ability of the complex system and the critical external stress.

The failure of a complex system with parallel redundancy can be estimated based on probabilistic properties of the system elements.

== See also ==
- Catastrophic failure – Sudden and total failure from which recovery is impossible
- Catastrophe theory – Area of mathematics
- Fracture mechanics – Study of propagation of cracks in materials
- Nuclear safety and security – Regulations for uses of radioactive materials
- Progressive collapse – Building collapse type
- Safety engineering – Engineering discipline which assures that engineered systems provide acceptable levels of safety
- Structural integrity and failure – Ability of a structure to support a designed structural load without breaking
