= Ehresmann's lemma =

On when a smooth map between smooth manifolds is a locally trivial fibration

In mathematics, or specifically, in differential topology, Ehresmann's lemma or Ehresmann's fibration theorem states that if a smooth mapping $f\colon M \rightarrow N$, where $M$ and $N$ are smooth manifolds, is

1. a surjective submersion, and
2. a proper map (in particular, this condition is always satisfied if M is compact),

then it is a locally trivial fibration. This is a foundational result in differential topology due to Charles Ehresmann, and has many variants.

== See also ==
- Thom's first isotopy lemma
