= Bernard Teissier =

French mathematician

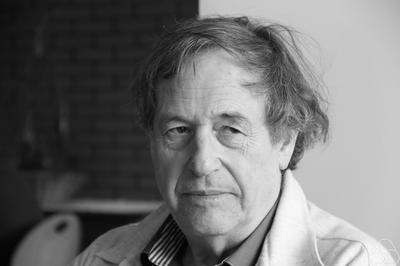
- Born: 1945 (age 80–81)
- Education: Paris Diderot University
- Scientific career
- Fields: Mathematics
- Workplaces: Paris Diderot University; Paris-Sud 11 University; University of Tehran
- Doctoral advisor: Heisuke Hironaka
- Doctoral students: François Loeser; David Trotman

Bernard Teissier (French pronunciation: [tɛsje]; born 1945) is a French mathematician and a member of the Nicolas Bourbaki group. He has made major contributions to algebraic geometry and commutative algebra, specifically to singularity theory, multiplicity theory and valuation theory.

Teissier attained his doctorate from Paris Diderot University in 1973, under supervision of Heisuke Hironaka. He was a member and a leading figure of Nicolas Bourbaki. Along with Alain Connes, he gave the 1975/1976 Peccot Lectures. He was an invited speaker at the International Congress of Mathematics at Warsaw in 1983.

In 2012, he became a fellow of the American Mathematical Society.
