= Zeeman's comparison theorem =

On when a morphism of spectral sequences in homological algebra is an isomorphism

In homological algebra, Zeeman's comparison theorem, introduced by Christopher Zeeman, gives conditions for a morphism of spectral sequences to be an isomorphism.

== Statement ==
Comparison theorem—Let $E^r_{p, q}, {}^{\prime}E^r_{p, q}$ be first quadrant spectral sequences of flat modules over a commutative ring and $f: E^r \to {}^{\prime}E^r$ a morphism between them. Then any two of the following statements implies the third:

1. $f: E_2^{p, 0} \to {}^{\prime} E_2^{p, 0}$ is an isomorphism for every p.
2. $f: E_2^{0, q} \to {}^{\prime} E_2^{0, q}$ is an isomorphism for every q.
3. $f: E_{\infty}^{p, q} \to {}^{\prime} E_{\infty}^{p, q}$ is an isomorphism for every p, q.

== Illustrative example ==
As an illustration, we sketch the proof of Borel's theorem, which says the cohomology ring of a classifying space is a polynomial ring.

First of all, with G as a Lie group and with $\mathbb{Q}$ as coefficient ring, we have the Serre spectral sequence $E_2^{p,q}$ for the fibration $G \to EG \to BG$. We have: $E_{\infty} \simeq \mathbb{Q}$ since EG is contractible. We also have a theorem of Hopf stating that $H^*(G; \mathbb{Q}) \simeq \Lambda(u_1, \dots, u_n)$, an exterior algebra generated by finitely many homogeneous elements.

Next, we let $E(i)$ be the spectral sequence whose second page is $E(i)_2 = \Lambda(x_i) \otimes \mathbb{Q}[y_i]$ and whose nontrivial differentials on the r-th page are given by $d(x_i) = y_i$ and the graded Leibniz rule. Let ${}^{\prime} E_{r} = \otimes_i E_{r}(i)$. Since the cohomology commutes with tensor products as we are working over a field, ${}^{\prime} E_{r}$ is again a spectral sequence such that ${}^{\prime} E_{\infty} \simeq \mathbb{Q} \otimes \dots \otimes \mathbb{Q} \simeq \mathbb{Q}$. Then we let

$$f: {}^{\prime} E_r \to E_r, \, x_i \mapsto u_i.$$

Note, by definition, f gives the isomorphism ${}^{\prime} E_r^{0, q} \simeq E_r^{0, q} = H^q(G; \mathbb{Q}).$ A crucial point is that f is a "ring homomorphism"; this rests on the technical conditions that $u_i$ are "transgressive" (cf. Hatcher for detailed discussion on this matter.) After this technical point is taken care, we conclude: $E_2^{p, 0} \simeq {}^{\prime} E_2^{p, 0}$ as ring by the comparison theorem; that is, $E_2^{p, 0} = H^p(BG; \mathbb{Q}) \simeq \mathbb{Q}[y_1, \dots, y_n].$

== Bibliography ==
- McCleary, John (2001), A User's Guide to Spectral Sequences, Cambridge Studies in Advanced Mathematics, vol. 58 (2nd ed.), Cambridge University Press, ISBN 978-0-521-56759-6, MR 1793722
- Roitberg, Joseph; Hilton, Peter (1976), "On the Zeeman comparison theorem for the homology of quasi-nilpotent fibrations" (PDF), The Quarterly Journal of Mathematics, Second Series, 27 (108): 433–444, doi:10.1093/qmath/27.4.433, ISSN 0033-5606, MR 0431151
- Zeeman, Erik Christopher (1957), "A proof of the comparison theorem for spectral sequences", Proc. Cambridge Philos. Soc., 53: 57–62, doi:10.1017/S0305004100031984, MR 0084769
