= Tame topology =

In mathematics, a tame topology is a hypothetical topology proposed by Alexander Grothendieck in his research program Esquisse d’un programme under the French name topologie modérée (moderate topology). It is a topology in which the theory of dévissage can be applied to stratified structures such as semialgebraic or semianalytic sets, and which excludes some pathological spaces that do not correspond to intuitive notions of spaces.

Some authors consider an o-minimal structure to be a candidate for realizing tame topology in the real case. There are also some other suggestions.

== See also ==
- Thom's first isotopy lemma
