= David Trotman =

British-French mathematician (1951–2025)

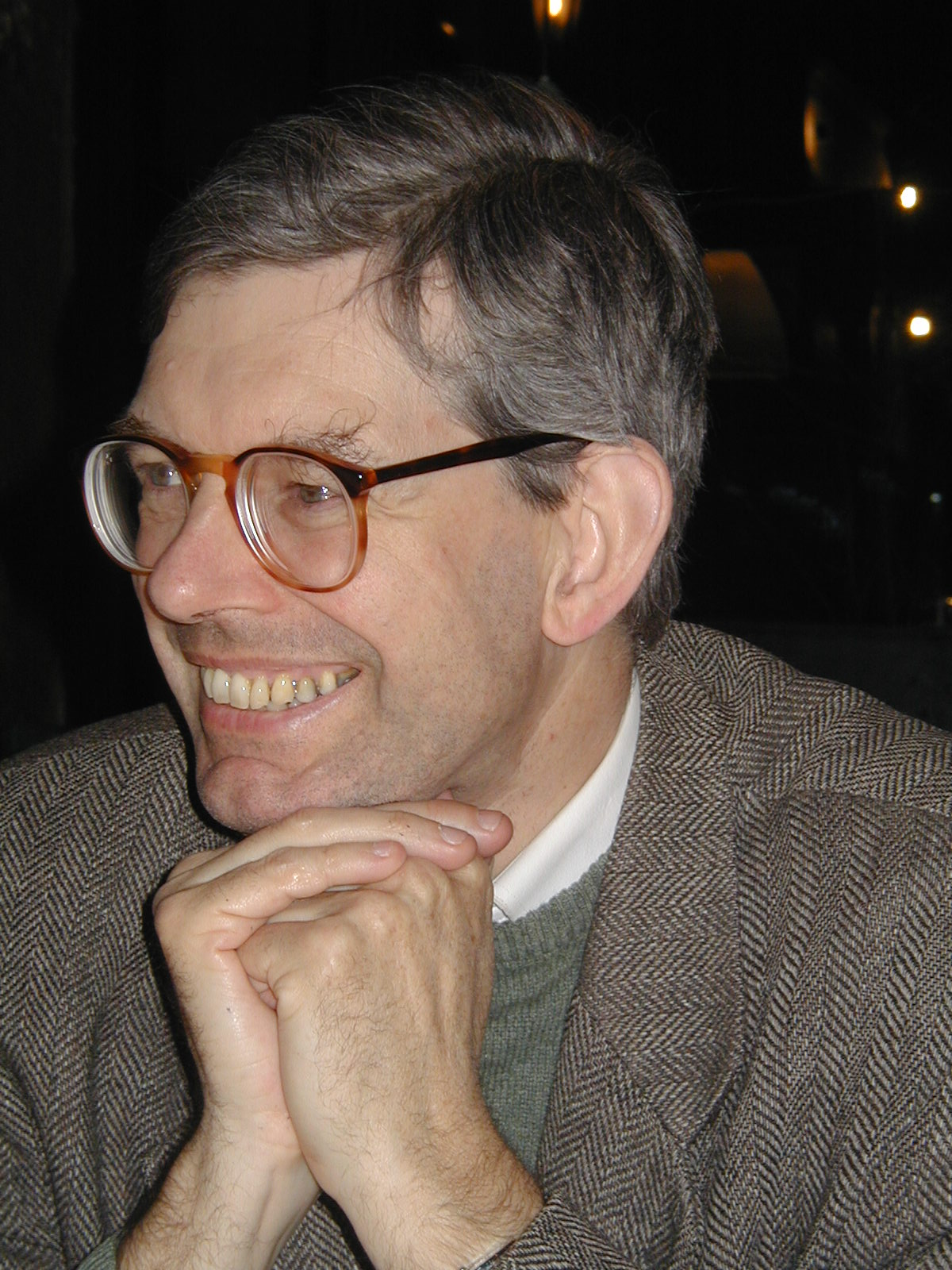
- Trotman in 2004
- Born: 27 September 1951; Plymouth, England
- Died: 26 April 2025 (aged 73); Aix-en-Provence, France
- Education: St. John's College, Cambridge; University of Warwick; Paris-Sud University
- Scientific career
- Fields: Mathematics
- Workplaces: University of Angers; University of Provence
- Thesis: Whitney Stratifications: Faults and Detectors (1977)
- Doctoral advisors: Christopher Zeeman, C. T. C. Wall; René Thom, Bernard Teissier

David John Angelo Trotman (27 September 1951 – 26 April 2025) was a mathematician, with dual British and French nationality. He was a grandson of the poet and author Oliver W. F. Lodge and a great-grandson of the physicist Oliver Lodge. He worked in an area of singularity theory known as the theory of stratifications, and particularly on properties of stratifications satisfying the Whitney conditions and other similar conditions (due to René Thom, Tzee-Char Kuo, Jean-Louis Verdier, Trotman himself, Karim Bekka and others) important for understanding topological stability.

At the age of 16, with Philip Crabtree, he was awarded the Explorer Belt in İzmir, Turkey.

Trotman was educated at King Edward's School in Stourbridge, before entering St. John's College, Cambridge in 1969, where he won the John Couch Adams Essay Prize in 1971 for an essay on plane algebraic curves. He carried out doctoral work at the University of Warwick, and Paris-Sud University in Orsay. His thesis, entitled Whitney Stratifications: Faults and Detectors, was directed by Christopher Zeeman and C. T. C. Wall while at Warwick, and Bernard Teissier and René Thom while at Orsay.

After positions at the University of Paris-Sud and the University of Angers, since 1988 Trotman was Professor of Mathematics at the University of Provence in Marseille, France, now called Aix-Marseille University. He held visiting positions at Cornell University, the University of Hawaiʻi at Mānoa, the Isaac Newton Institute of the University of Cambridge, the Mathematical Sciences Research Institute in Berkeley, California, and the Fields Institute in Toronto, Canada.

Trotman was Director of the Graduate School in Mathematics and Computing of Marseilles from 1996 to 2004, and was an elected member of the CNU (the French National University Council) from 1999 until 2007.
