= Stallings–Zeeman theorem =

Result in algebraic topology

In mathematics, the Stallings–Zeeman theorem is a result in algebraic topology, used in the proof of the Poincaré conjecture for dimension greater than or equal to five. It is named after the mathematicians John R. Stallings and Christopher Zeeman.

== Statement of the theorem ==
Let M be a finite simplicial complex of dimension dim(M) = m ≥ 5. Suppose that M has the homotopy type of the m-dimensional sphere S^{m} and that M is locally piecewise linearly homeomorphic to m-dimensional Euclidean space R^{m}. Then M is homeomorphic to S^{m} under a map that is piecewise linear except possibly at a single point x. That is, M \ {x} is piecewise linearly homeomorphic to R^{m}.
