= Stratified space =

Type of topological space

In mathematics, especially in topology, a stratified space is a topological space that admits or is equipped with a stratification, a decomposition into subspaces, which are nice in some sense (e.g., smooth or flat).

A basic example is a subset of a smooth manifold that admits a Whitney stratification. But there is also an abstract stratified space such as a Thom–Mather stratified space.

On a stratified space, a constructible sheaf can be defined as a sheaf that is locally constant on each stratum.

Among the several ideals, Grothendieck's Esquisse d’un programme considers (or proposes) a stratified space with what he calls the tame topology.

== A stratified space in the sense of Mather ==
Mather gives the following definition of a stratified space. A prestratification on a topological space X is a partition of X into subsets (called strata) such that (a) each stratum is locally closed, (b) it is locally finite and (c) (axiom of frontier) if two strata A, B are such that the closure of A intersects B, then B lies in the closure of A. A stratification on X is a rule that assigns to a point x in X a set germ $S_x$ at x of a closed subset of X that satisfies the following axiom: for each point x in X, there exists a neighborhood U of x and a prestratification of U such that for each y in U, $S_x$ is the set germ at y of the stratum of the prestratification on U containing y.

A stratified space is then a topological space equipped with a stratification.

== Pseudomanifold ==
In MacPherson's stratified pseudomanifolds; The strata are the differences X_{i+i}-X_{i} between sets in the filtration. There is also a local conical condition; there must be an almost smooth atlas where locally each little open set looks like the product of two factors R^{n}x c(L); a euclidean factor and the topological cone of a space L. Classically, here is the point where the definition turns to be obscure, since L is asked to be a stratified pseudomanifold. The logical problem is avoided by an inductive trick which makes different the objects L and X.

The changes of charts or cocycles have no conditions in the MacPherson's original context. Pflaum asks them to be smooth, while in the Thom-Mather context they must preserve the above decomposition, they have to be smooth in the Euclidean factor and preserve the conical radium.

== See also ==
- Equisingularity
- Perverse sheaf
- Stratified Morse theory
- Harder–Narasimhan stratification
- Diffeological space
