= David Fowler (mathematician) =

British mathematician (1937–2004)

- Born: 28 April 1937; Blackburn, England
- Died: 13 April 2004 (aged 66); Warwick, England
- Education: Gonville and Caius College, Cambridge
- Occupation: Mathematician
- Known for: Greek mathematics
- Scientific career
- Workplaces: Manchester University; University of Warwick

David Herbert Fowler (28 April 1937 – 13 April 2004) was a historian of Greek mathematics who published work on pre-Eudoxian ratio theory (using the process he called anthyphairesis). He disputed the standard story of Greek mathematical discovery, in which the discovery of the phenomenon of incommensurability came as a shock.

Fowler was also the translator of René Thom's book Structural Stability and Morphogenesis from French (Stabilité structurelle et morphogénèse) into English.
