= C. T. C. Wall =

British mathematician (1936–2026)

C. T. C. Wall FRS
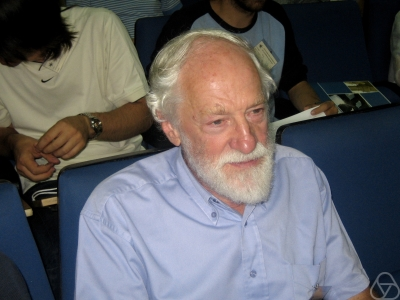
- In 2006
- Born: 14 December 1936; Bristol, England
- Died: 18 November 2026 (aged 89)
- Education: Marlborough College; Trinity College, Cambridge
- Known for: L-theory; Brauer–Wall group Wall theorems
- Awards: Berwick Prize (1963); Senior Whitehead Prize (1976); Pólya Prize (1988); Sylvester Medal (1988)
- Scientific career
- Workplaces: University of Liverpool
- Thesis: Algebraic aspects of cobordism (1959)
- Doctoral advisors: Frank Adams; Christopher Zeeman
- Notable students: Michael Boardman; Bill Bruce; Andrew Casson; David Trotman

Charles Terence Clegg Wall (14 December 1936 – 18 November 2026), also known as Terry Wall, was a British mathematician, who was educated at Marlborough and Trinity College, Cambridge. He was a professor of the University of Liverpool, first appointed in 1965. From 1978 to 1980 he was the president of the London Mathematical Society.

== Work ==
His early work was in cobordism theory in algebraic topology; this includes his 1959 Cambridge PhD thesis entitled "Algebraic aspects of cobordism", written under the direction of Frank Adams and Christopher Zeeman. His research was then mainly in the area of manifolds, particularly geometric topology and related abstract algebra included in surgery theory, of which he was one of the founders. In 1964, this led to the four Wall theorems. Also in 1964 he introduced the Brauer–Wall group of a field. His 1970 research monograph "Surgery on Compact Manifolds" is a major reference work in geometric topology.

In 1971 he conjectured that every finitely generated group is accessible. The conjecture motivated much progress in the understanding of splittings of groups. In 1985 Martin Dunwoody proved the conjecture for the class of finitely presented groups. The resolution of the full conjecture took until 1991 when, surprising to most mathematicians at the time, Dunwoody found a finitely generated group that is not accessible and hence the conjecture turned out to be not correct in its general formulation.

Wall's work from the mid-1970s was mostly in singularity theory as developed by R. Thom, J. Milnor and V. Arnold, and especially concerns the classification of isolated singularities of differentiable maps and of algebraic varieties. He wrote two research monographs on singularity theory, "The Geometry of Topological Stability" (1995) (containing a great deal of original work) with Andrew du Plessis, and "Singular Points of Plane Curves" (2004).

His notable students include Michael Boardman, Bill Bruce, Andrew Casson, Francis E. A. Johnson, David Mond, Andrew du Plessis, and David Trotman.

== Personal life and death ==
Wall was married to Sandra Hearnshaw from 1959, and they had four children together.

He was the treasurer of the Wirral area SDP from 1985 until its merger with the then Liberal Party in 1988. Wall continued on as treasurer of the newly formed Wirral West Liberal Democrats but, as of May 2020, was no longer holding this position.

Wall was an LEA appointed governor of West Kirby Grammar School from 1987 but also gave up this position. He also held the post of treasurer at Hoylake Chamber Concert Society.

He had seven grandchildren and four great grandchildren as of 2024. Wall died on 18 November 2026, aged 89.

== Awards ==
- 1965 – Berwick Prize
- 1966 – Invited address at the 1966 ICM in Moscow
- 1969 – Elected Fellow of the Royal Society
- 1970 – Invited address at the 1970 ICM in Nice
- 1976 – Senior Whitehead Prize
- 1988 – Pólya Prize
- 1988 – Sylvester Medal
- 1990 – Elected a Foreign Member of the Royal Danish Academy of Sciences and Letters
- 2000 – Elected Honorary Member of the Irish Mathematical Society
- 2012 – Fellow of the American Mathematical Society
