= Submersion (mathematics) =

Differential map between manifolds whose differential is everywhere surjective

In mathematics, a submersion is a differentiable map between differentiable manifolds whose differential pushforward is everywhere surjective. It is a basic concept in differential topology, dual to that of an immersion.

== Definition ==
Let M and N be differentiable manifolds, and let $f\colon M\to N$ be a differentiable map between them. The map f is a submersion at a point $p \in M$ if its differential

$$Df_p \colon T_p M \to T_{f(p)}N$$

is a surjective linear map. In this case, p is called a regular point of the map f; otherwise, p is a critical point. A point $q \in N$ is a regular value of f if all points p in the preimage $f^{-1}(q)$ are regular points. A differentiable map f that is a submersion at each point $p \in M$ is called a submersion. Equivalently, f is a submersion if its differential $Df_p$ has constant rank equal to the dimension of N.

Some authors use the term critical point to describe a point where the rank of the Jacobian matrix of f at p is not maximal.: Indeed, this is the more useful notion in singularity theory. If the dimension of M is greater than or equal to the dimension of N, then these two notions of critical point coincide. However, if the dimension of M is less than the dimension of N, all points are critical according to the definition above (the differential cannot be surjective), but the rank of the Jacobian may still be maximal (if it is equal to dim M). The definition given above is the more commonly used one, e.g., in the formulation of Sard's theorem.

== Submersion theorem ==
Given a submersion $f\colon M\to N$ between smooth manifolds of dimensions $m$ and $n$, for each $x \in M$ there exist surjective charts $\phi : U \to \mathbb{R}^m$ of $M$ around $x$, and $\psi : V \to \mathbb{R}^n$ of $N$ around $f(x)$, such that $f$ restricts to a submersion $f \colon U \to V$ which, when expressed in coordinates as $\psi \circ f \circ \phi^{-1} : \mathbb{R}^m \to \mathbb{R}^n$, becomes an ordinary orthogonal projection. As an application, for each $p \in N$ the corresponding fiber of $f$, denoted $M_p = f^{-1}({p})$ can be equipped with the structure of a smooth submanifold of $M$ whose dimension equals the difference of the dimensions of $N$ and $M$.

This theorem is a consequence of the inverse function theorem (see Inverse function theorem#Giving a manifold structure).

For example, consider $f\colon \mathbb{R}^3 \to \mathbb{R}$ given by $f(x,y,z) = x^4 + y^4 +z^4.$. The Jacobian matrix is

$$\begin{bmatrix}\frac{\partial f}{\partial x} & \frac{\partial f}{\partial y} & \frac{\partial f}{\partial z} \end{bmatrix} = \begin{bmatrix} 4x^3 & 4y^3 & 4z^3 \end{bmatrix}.$$

This has maximal rank at every point except for $(0,0,0)$. Also, the fibers

$$f^{-1}(\{t\}) = \left\{(a,b,c)\in \mathbb{R}^3 : a^4 + b^4 + c^4 = t\right\}$$

are empty for $t < 0$, and equal to a point when $t = 0$. Hence, we only have a smooth submersion $f\colon \mathbb{R}^3\setminus {(0,0,0)}\to \mathbb{R}_{>0},$ and the subsets $M_t = \left\{(a,b,c)\in \mathbb{R}^3 : a^4 + b^4 + c^4 = t\right\}$ are two-dimensional smooth manifolds for $t > 0$.

== Examples ==
- Any projection $\pi\colon \mathbb{R}^{m+n} \rightarrow \mathbb{R}^n\subset \mathbb{R}^{m+n}$
- Local diffeomorphisms
- Riemannian submersions
- The projection in a smooth vector bundle or a more general smooth fibration. The surjectivity of the differential is a necessary condition for the existence of a local trivialization.

=== Maps between spheres ===
A large class of examples of submersions are submersions between spheres of higher dimension, such as

$$f:S^{n+k} \to S^k$$

whose fibers have dimension $n$. This is because the fibers (inverse images of elements $p \in S^k$) are smooth manifolds of dimension $n$. Then, if we take a path

$$\gamma: I \to S^k$$

and take the pullback

$$\begin{matrix}
M_I & \to & S^{n+k} \\
\downarrow & & \downarrow f \\
I & x\rightarrow{\gamma} & S^k
\end{matrix}$$

we get an example of a special kind of bordism, called a framed bordism. In fact, the framed cobordism groups $\Omega_n^{fr}$ are intimately related to the stable homotopy groups.

=== Families of algebraic varieties ===
Another large class of submersions is given by families of algebraic varieties $\pi:\mathfrak{X} \to S$ whose fibers are smooth algebraic varieties. If we consider the underlying manifolds of these varieties, we get smooth manifolds. For example, the Weierstrass family $\pi:\mathcal{W} \to \mathbb{A}^1$ of elliptic curves is a widely studied submersion because it includes many technical complexities used to demonstrate more complex theory, such as intersection homology and perverse sheaves. This family is given by

$\mathcal{W} = \left\{(t,x,y) \in \mathbb{A}^1\times \mathbb{A}^2 : y^2 = x(x-1)(x-t) \right\}$

where $\mathbb{A}^1$ is the affine line and $\mathbb{A}^2$ is the affine plane. Since we are considering complex varieties, these are equivalently the spaces $\mathbb{C},\mathbb{C}^2$ of the complex line and the complex plane. Note that we should actually remove the points $t = 0,1$ because there are singularities (since there is a double root).

== Local normal form ==
If f: M → N is a submersion at p and f(p) = q ∈ N, then there exists an open neighborhood U of p in M, an open neighborhood V of q in N, and local coordinates (x_{1}, …, x_{m}) at p and (x_{1}, …, x_{n}) at q such that f(U) = V, and the map f in these local coordinates is the standard projection

$$f(x_1, \ldots, x_n, x_{n+1}, \ldots, x_m) = (x_1, \ldots, x_n).$$

It follows that the full preimage f^{−1}(q) in M of a regular value q in N under a differentiable map f: M → N is either empty or a differentiable manifold of dimension dim M − dim N, possibly disconnected. This is the content of the regular value theorem (also known as the submersion theorem). In particular, the conclusion holds for all q in N if the map f is a submersion.

== Topological manifold submersions ==
Submersions are also well-defined for general topological manifolds. A topological manifold submersion is a continuous surjection f : M → N such that for all p in M, for some continuous charts ψ at p and φ at f(p), the map ψ^{−1} ∘ f ∘ φ is equal to the projection map from R^{m} to R^{n}, where m = dim(M) ≥ n = dim(N).

== See also ==
- Ehresmann's fibration theorem
