= List of Miller Research Fellows =

This is a list of people designated by the Miller Institute as Miller Research Fellows:

This list is incomplete: Only those in mathematics are included so far. There are Miller Fellows in all basic sciences, for example also in Astronomy, Physics, and Chemistry. There is a complete list at the Miller Institute web page. See also Category:University of California, Berkeley Miller Fellows

== Mathematics ==
Name	Time	PhD	Current affiliation
Adams, Jeffrey	1983–1985	Yale University, 1981	University of Maryland
Anderson, Greg	1984–1986	Princeton University, 1980	University of Minnesota
Bakalov, Bojko	2000–2003	Massachusetts Institute of Technology, 2000	North Carolina State University
Bourlioux, Anne	1991–1993	Princeton University, 1990	Université de Montréal
Browder, Andrew	1963–1965	Massachusetts Institute of Technology, 1961	Brown University
Brumfiel, Gregory	1968–1970	Massachusetts Institute of Technology, 1967	Stanford University
Buzzard, Kevin	1995–1997	University of Cambridge, 1995	Imperial College London
Chen, Szu-Yu Sophie	2006–2008	Princeton University, 2006	Institute for Advanced Study
Cole, Brian	1972–1974	Yale University, 1968	Brown University
Crainic, Marius	2001–2002	Utrecht University, 2000	Utrecht University
D'Andrea, Carlos	2002–2005	University of Buenos Aires, 2001	University of Barcelona
Dolgopyat, Dmitry	1997–1999	Princeton University, 1997	University of Maryland
Douglas, Christopher	2007–2010	Massachusetts Institute of Technology, 2005	University of Oxford
Dumitriu, Ioana	2003–2006	Massachusetts Institute of Technology, 2003	University of Washington
Enflo, Per	1971–1973	Stockholm University, 1970	Kent State University
Engström, Alexander	2009–2012	Royal Institute of Technology, 2009	Aalto University, Finland
Fattal, Raanan	2005–2008	Hebrew University of Jerusalem, 2005	Hebrew University of Jerusalem
Fujita, Takao	1979–1981		Tokyo Institute of Technology
Goldfeld, Morris Dorian	1969–1971	Columbia University, 1969	Columbia University
Griffiths, Phillip	1962–1964	Princeton University, 1962	Institute for Advanced Study
Gromoll, Detlef*	1966–1968	University of Bonn, 1962	Stony Brook University
Hamenstädt, Ursula	1986–1988	University of Bonn, 1986	University of Bonn
Harrison, Jenny	1977–1979	University of Warwick, 1975	University of California, Berkeley
Hausel, Tamas	1999–2002	University of Cambridge, 1998	University of Oxford
Heluani, Reimundo	2006–2009	Massachusetts Institute of Technology, 2006	IMPA
Izumi, Masaki	1994–1996		Kyoto University
Jayawardhana, Ray	2000– 2002	Harvard University, 2000	Johns Hopkins University
Johansson, August	2010–2013	Umeå University, 2010	University of California, Berkeley
Kallman, Robert	1970–1972	Massachusetts Institute of Technology, 1969	University of North Texas
Kamber, Franz	1965–1967	University of Zurich, 1965	University of Illinois at Urbana–Champaign
Kapouleas, Nicolaos	1988–1991	UC Berkeley, 1988	Brown University
Kawahigashi, Yasuyuki	1991–1992	University of California, Los Angeles, 1989	University of Tokyo
Kawai, Takahiro	1974–1976		Kyoto University
Kawamata, Yujiro	1981–1983	University of Tokyo, 1980	University of Tokyo
Ketonen, Jussi	1972–1974	University of Wisconsin–Madison, 1971	Stanford University
Klainerman, Sergiu	1978–1980	New York University, 1978	Princeton University
Lackenby, Marc	1997–1998	University of Cambridge, 1997	University of Oxford
Langlands, Robert	1964–1965	Yale University, 1960	Institute for Advanced Study
Lind, Douglas	1973–1975	Stanford University, 1973	University of Washington
Lucks, Julius	2007–2010	Harvard University, 2007	Cornell University
Mantovan, Elena	2002–2005	Harvard University, 2002	Caltech
Matsen, Frederick	2007–2010	Harvard University, 2005	Fred Hutchinson Cancer Research Center
Meier, Michael	1982–1984	University of Bonn, 1978	
Merel, Loïc	1995–1997	Paris VI University, 1993	Paris Diderot University
Morrison, Scott	2009–2012	University of California, Berkeley, 2007	University of California, Berkeley
Mossel, Elchanan	2002–2003	Hebrew University, 2000	Massachusetts Institute of Technology
Nekovar, Jan	1991–1993	Academy of Sciences of the Czech Republic, 1991	Paris VI University
Ocneanu, Adrian	1983–1985	University of Warwick, 1983	Pennsylvania State University
Paneitz, Stephen*	1980–1982	Massachusetts Institute of Technology, 1980	
Perelman, Grigori	1993–1995	Saint Petersburg State University, 1990	
Postnikov, Alexander	1999–2001	Massachusetts Institute of Technology, 1997	Massachusetts Institute of Technology
Radulescu, Florin	1992–1994	University of California, Los Angeles, 1991	University of Iowa
Roper, Marcus	2008–2011	Harvard University, 2007	University of California, Los Angeles
Rosso, Marc	1990–1992	Paris VII, 1990	École Normale Supérieure
Rudolph, Daniel*	1976–1978	Stanford University, 1975	University of Maryland
Saito, Shuji	1986–1988	University of Tokyo, 1986	University of Tokyo
Sanyal, Raman	2008–2011	Technische Universität Berlin, 2008	Freie Universitat Berlin
Savin, Ovidiu	2003–2006	University of Texas at Austin, 2003	Columbia University
Scott, Dana	1960–1962	Princeton University, 1958	Carnegie Mellon University
Shearer, James	1981–1983	Massachusetts Institute of Technology, 1980	IBM Research
Stanley, Richard	1971–1973	Harvard University, 1971	Massachusetts Institute of Technology
Sullivan, Dennis	1967–1968	Princeton University, 1966	City University of New York
Teichner, Peter	1996–1997	University of Mainz, 1992	University of California, Berkeley
Todorcevic, Stevo	1983–1985	University of Belgrade, 1979	University of Toronto
Tsunoda, Shuichiro	1985–1987	Osaka University, 1985	Nara Women's University
Vojta, Paul	1987–1989	Harvard University, 1983	University of California, Berkeley
Wassermann, Antony	1986–1988	University of Pennsylvania, 1981	University of Cambridge
