= Whitney conditions =

Stratifiability condition in mathematical topology

In differential topology, a branch of mathematics, the Whitney conditions are conditions on a pair of submanifolds of a manifold introduced by Hassler Whitney in 1965.

A stratification of a topological space is a finite filtration by closed subsets F_{i}, such that the difference between successive members F_{i} and F_{i −1} of the filtration is either empty or a smooth submanifold of dimension i. The connected components of the difference F_{i} − F_{i −1} are the strata of dimension i. A stratification is called a Whitney stratification if all pairs of strata satisfy the Whitney conditions A and B, as defined below.

== The Whitney conditions in R^{n} ==
Let X and Y be two disjoint (locally closed) submanifolds of R^{n}, of dimensions i and j.

- X and Y satisfy Whitney's condition A if whenever a sequence of points x_{1}, x_{2}, … in X converges to a point y in Y, and the sequence of tangent i-planes T_{m} to X at the points x_{m} converges to an i-plane T as m tends to infinity, then T contains the tangent j-plane to Y at y.
- X and Y satisfy Whitney's condition B if for each sequence x_{1}, x_{2}, … of points in X and each sequence y_{1}, y_{2}, … of points in Y, both converging to the same point y in Y, such that the sequence of secant lines L_{m} between x_{m} and y_{m} converges to a line L as m tends to infinity, and the sequence of tangent i-planes T_{m} to X at the points x_{m} converges to an i-plane T as m tends to infinity, then L is contained in T.

John Mather first pointed out that Whitney's condition B implies Whitney's condition A in the notes of his lectures at Harvard in 1970, which have been widely distributed. He also defined the notion of Thom–Mather stratified space, and proved that every Whitney stratification is a Thom–Mather stratified space and hence is a topologically stratified space. Another approach to this fundamental result was given earlier by René Thom in 1969.

David Trotman showed in his 1977 Warwick thesis that a stratification of a closed subset in a smooth manifold M satisfies Whitney's condition A if and only if the subspace of the space of smooth mappings from a smooth manifold N into M consisting of all those maps which are transverse to all of the strata of the stratification, is open (using the Whitney, or strong, topology). The subspace of mappings transverse to any countable family of submanifolds of M is always dense by Thom's transversality theorem. The density of the set of transverse mappings is often interpreted by saying that transversality is a 'generic' property for smooth mappings, while the openness is often interpreted by saying that the property is 'stable'.

The reason that Whitney conditions have become so widely used is because of Whitney's 1965 theorem that every algebraic variety, or indeed analytic variety, admits a Whitney stratification, i.e. admits a partition into smooth submanifolds satisfying the Whitney conditions. More general singular spaces can be given Whitney stratifications, such as semialgebraic sets (due to René Thom) and subanalytic sets (due to Heisuke Hironaka). This has led to their use in engineering, control theory and robotics. In a thesis under the direction of Wieslaw Pawlucki at the Jagellonian University in Kraków, Poland, the Vietnamese mathematician Ta Lê Loi proved further that every definable set in an o-minimal structure can be given a Whitney stratification.

== See also ==
- Thom–Mather stratified space
- Topologically stratified space
- Thom's first isotopy lemma
- Stratified space
