= Tri-state =

Tri-state may refer to:

- Tri-State Airport, a public airport located in West Virginia, United States
- Tri-state area, an area where three states of the U.S. meet at one point or share a metropolitan area
- Tri-State (basketball), the 3-on-3 basketball team that plays in the BIG3
- Tri-State Bird Rescue and Research, a wildlife rehabilitation organization specializing in bird rescue during oil spills
- Tri-State Christian Television, a network of several religious TV stations
- Tri-State League, five circuits in American minor league baseball
- Tri-state logic, electronic logic gate type
- Tri-State Tollway, a U.S. toll road
- Trine University, formerly Tri-State University, a university in Angola, Indiana
- Tri-State (album), a 2006 album by Above & Beyond
- Tri-State (band), an American rock band
- Tri-state check box, specific graphical user interface element
- Tri-State Tornado, the 1925 deadliest single tornado ever recorded in the United States
- Tri-State district, a historic lead-zinc mining district (Missouri, Kansas and Oklahoma)

== See also ==
- Tri-State Conference (disambiguation)
- Tripoint (disambiguation)
- Illinois–Indiana–Kentucky tri-state area
- New York metropolitan area (New York, New Jersey, Connecticut)
