= Regular homotopy =

In the mathematical field of topology, a regular homotopy refers to a special kind of homotopy between immersions of one manifold in another. The homotopy must be a 1-parameter family of immersions.

Similar to homotopy classes, one defines two immersions to be in the same regular homotopy class if there exists a regular homotopy between them. Regular homotopy for immersions is similar to isotopy of embeddings: they are both restricted types of homotopies. Stated another way, two continuous functions $f,g : M \to N$ are homotopic if they represent points in the same path-components of the mapping space $C(M, N)$, given the compact-open topology. The space of immersions is the subset of $C(M, N)$ consisting of immersions, denoted by $\operatorname{Imm}(M, N)$, given the $C^1$ topology. Two immersions $f, g: M \to N$ are regularly homotopic if they represent points in the same path-component of $\operatorname{Imm}(M,N)$.

== Examples ==
Any two knots in 3-space are equivalent by regular homotopy, though not by isotopy.

This curve has total curvature 6π, and turning number 3.

The Whitney–Graustein theorem classifies the regular homotopy classes of a circle into the plane; two immersions are regularly homotopic if and only if they have the same turning number – equivalently, total curvature; equivalently, if and only if their Gauss maps have the same degree/winding number.

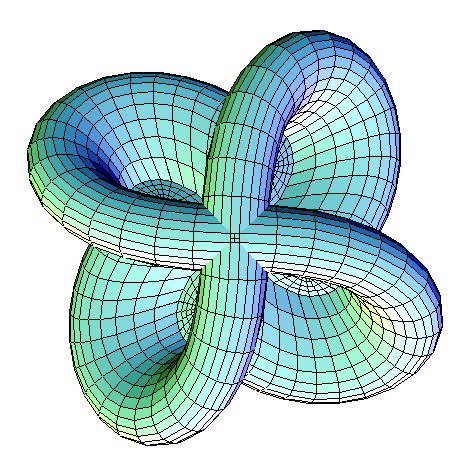
Smale's classification of immersions of spheres shows that sphere eversions exist, which can be realized via this Morin surface.

Stephen Smale classified the regular homotopy classes of a k-sphere immersed in $\mathbb R^n$ – they are classified by homotopy groups of Stiefel manifolds, which is a generalization of the Gauss map, with here k partial derivatives not vanishing. More precisely, the set $I(n,k)$ of regular homotopy classes of embeddings of sphere $S^k$ in $\mathbb{R}^n$ is in one-to-one correspondence with elements of group $\pi_k\left(V_k\left(\mathbb{R}^n\right)\right)$. In case $k = n - 1$ we have $V_{n-1}\left(\mathbb{R}^n\right) \cong SO(n)$. Since $SO(1)$ is path connected, $\pi_2(SO(3)) \cong \pi_2\left(\mathbb{R}P^3\right) \cong \pi_2\left(S^3\right) \cong 0$ and $\pi_6(SO(6)) \to \pi_6(SO(7)) \to \pi_6\left(S^6\right) \to \pi_5(SO(6)) \to \pi_5(SO(7))$ and due to Bott periodicity theorem we have $\pi_6(SO(6))\cong \pi_6(\operatorname{Spin}(6))\cong \pi_6(SU(4))\cong \pi_6(U(4)) \cong 0$ and since $\pi_5(SO(6)) \cong \mathbb{Z},\ \pi_5(SO(7)) \cong 0$ then we have $\pi_6(SO(7))\cong 0$. Therefore all immersions of spheres $S^0,\ S^2$ and $S^6$ in euclidean spaces of one more dimension are regular homotopic. In particular, spheres $S^n$ embedded in $\mathbb{R}^{n+1}$ admit eversion if $n = 0, 2, 6$, i.e. one can turn these spheres "inside-out".

Both of these examples consist of reducing regular homotopy to homotopy; this has subsequently been substantially generalized in the homotopy principle (or h-principle) approach.

== Non-degenerate homotopy ==
For locally convex, closed space curves, one can also define non-degenerate homotopy. Here, the 1-parameter family of immersions must be non-degenerate (i.e. the curvature may never vanish). There are 2 distinct non-degenerate homotopy classes. Further restrictions of non-vanishing torsion lead to 4 distinct equivalence classes.

== See also ==
- Arnold invariants
