= Sphere eversion =

Topological operation of turning a sphere inside-out without creasing

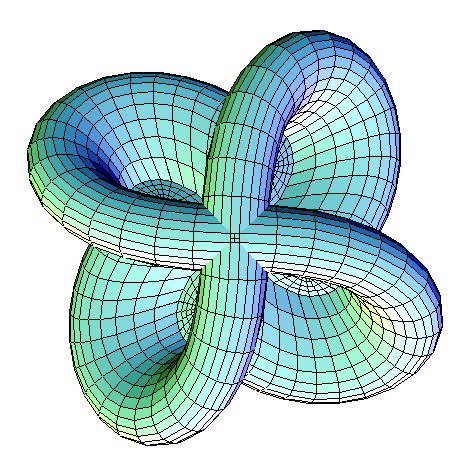
A Morin surface seen from "above"

Sphere eversion process as described in

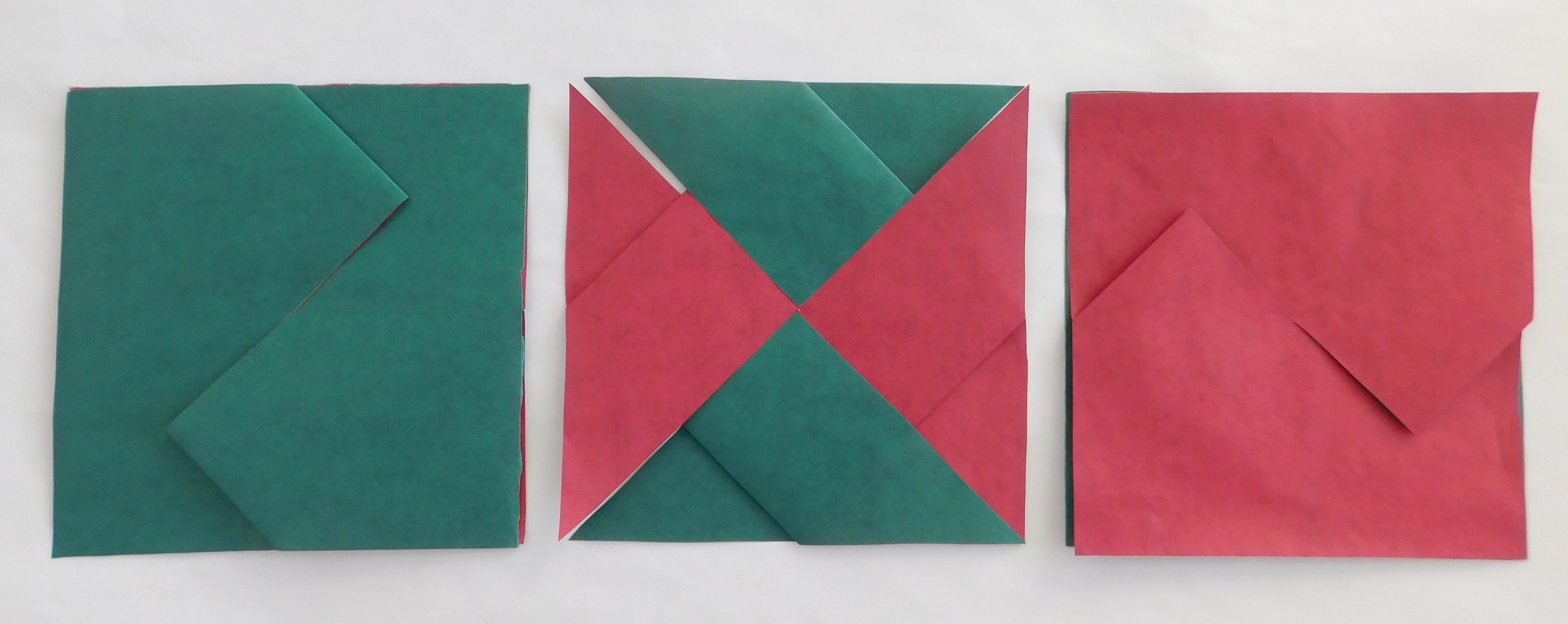
Paper sphere eversion and Morin surface

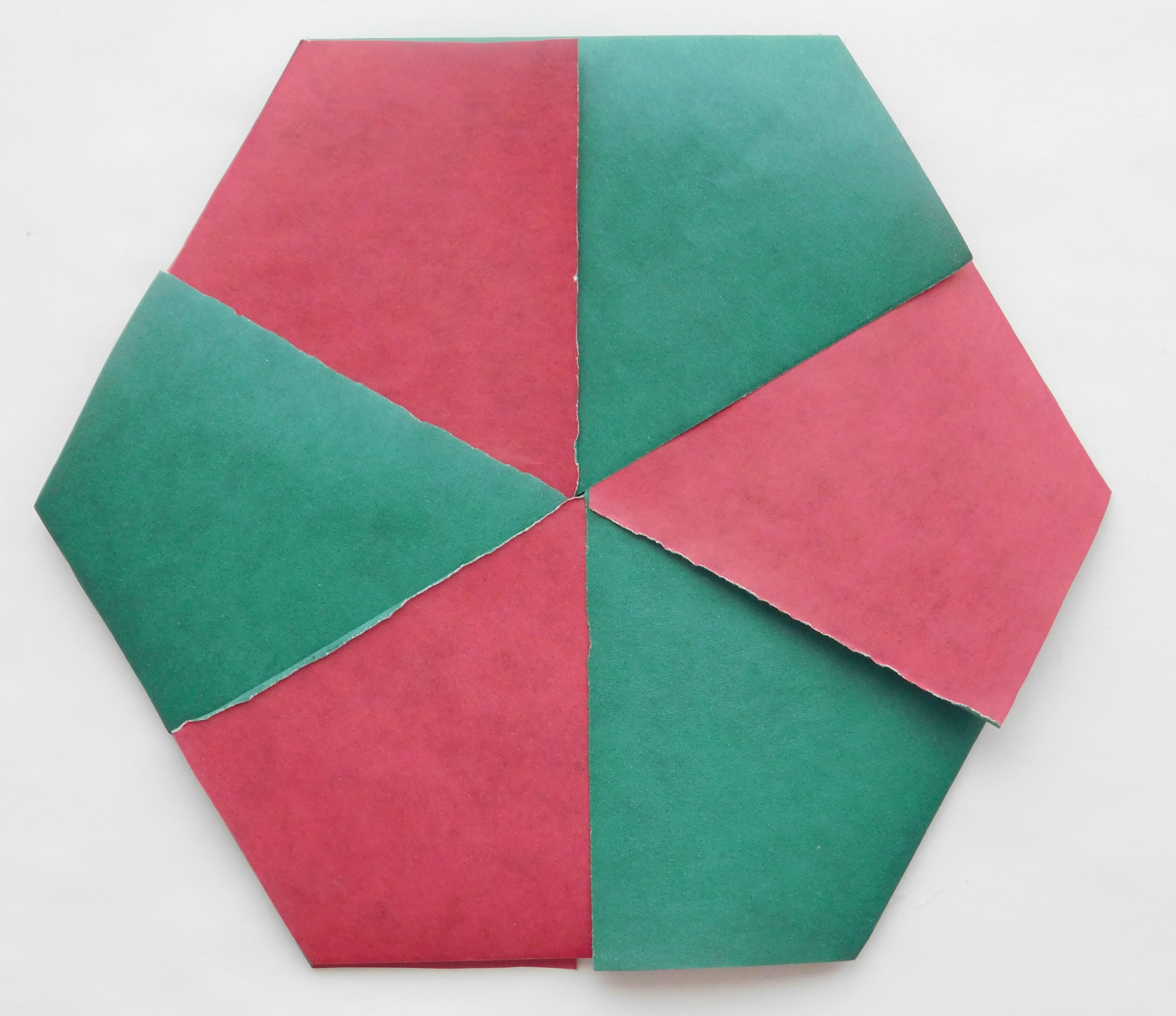
Paper Morin surface (sphere eversion halfway) with hexagonal symmetry

In differential topology, sphere eversion is a theoretical process of turning a sphere inside out in a three-dimensional space (the word eversion means "turning inside out"). It is possible to smoothly and continuously turn a sphere inside out in this way (allowing self-intersections of the sphere's surface) without cutting or tearing it or creating any crease. This is surprising, both to non-mathematicians and to those who understand regular homotopy, and can be regarded as a veridical paradox; that is something that, while being true, on first glance seems false.

More precisely, let

$$f\colon S^2\to \R^3$$

be the standard embedding; then there is a regular homotopy of immersions

$$f_t\colon S^2\to \R^3$$

such that f_{0} = f and f_{1} = −f.

== History ==
An existence proof for crease-free sphere eversion was first created by Stephen Smale (1958). It is difficult to visualize a particular example of such a turning, although some digital animations have been produced that make it somewhat easier. The first example was exhibited through the efforts of several mathematicians, including Arnold S. Shapiro and Bernard Morin, who was blind. On the other hand, it is much easier to prove that such a "turning" exists, and that is what Smale did.

Smale's graduate adviser Raoul Bott at first told Smale that the result was obviously wrong (Levy 1995). His reasoning was that the degree of the Gauss map must be preserved in such "turning"—in particular it follows that there is no such turning of S^{1} in R^{2}. But the degrees of the Gauss map for the embeddings f and −f in R^{3} are both equal to 1, and do not have opposite sign as one might incorrectly guess. The degree of the Gauss map of all immersions of S^{2} in R^{3} is 1, so there is no obstacle. The term "veridical paradox" applies perhaps more appropriately at this level: until Smale's work, there was no documented attempt to argue for or against the eversion of S^{2}, and later efforts are in hindsight, so there never was a historical paradox associated with sphere eversion, only an appreciation of the subtleties in visualizing it by those confronting the idea for the first time.

See h-principle (homotopy principle) for further generalizations.

== Proof ==
Smale's original proof was indirect: he identified (regular homotopy) classes of immersions of spheres with a homotopy group of the Stiefel manifold. Since the homotopy group that corresponds to immersions of $S^2$ in $\R^3$ vanishes, the standard embedding and the inside-out one must be regular homotopic. In principle the proof can be unwound to produce an explicit regular homotopy, but this is not easy to do.

There are several ways of producing explicit examples and mathematical visualization:

Minimax sphere eversion; see the video's Wikimedia Commons page for a description of the video's contents

- Half-way models: these consist of very special homotopies. This is the original method, first done by Shapiro and Phillips via Boy's surface, later refined by many others. The original half-way model homotopies were constructed by hand, and worked topologically but weren't minimal. The movie created by Nelson Max, over a seven-year period, and based on Charles C. Pugh's chicken-wire models (subsequently stolen from the Mathematics Department at Berkeley), was a computer-graphics 'tour de force' for its time, and set the bench-mark for computer animation for many years. A more recent and definitive graphics refinement (1980s) is minimax eversions, which is a variational method, and consist of special homotopies (they are shortest paths with respect to Willmore energy). In turn, understanding behavior of Willmore energy requires understanding solutions of fourth-order partial differential equations, and so the visually beautiful and evocative images belie some very deep mathematics beyond Smale's original abstract proof.

Sphere eversion using Thurston's corrugations; see the video's Wikimedia Commons page for a description of the video's contents

- Thurston's corrugations: this is a topological method and generic; it takes a homotopy and perturbs it so that it becomes a regular homotopy. This is illustrated in the computer-graphics animation Outside In developed at the Geometry Center under the direction of Silvio Levy, Delle Maxwell and Tamara Munzner.
- Combining the above methods, the complete sphere eversion can be described by a set of closed equations giving minimal topological complexity

== Variations ==
- A six-dimensional sphere $S^6$ in seven-dimensional euclidean space $\mathbb{R}^7$ admits eversion. With an evident case of an 0-dimensional sphere $S^0$ (two distinct points) in a real line $\mathbb{R}$ and described above case of a two-dimensional sphere in $\mathbb{R}^3$ there are only three cases when sphere $S^n$ embedded in euclidean space $\mathbb{R}^{n+1}$ admits eversion.

== Gallery of eversion steps ==
Surface plots
Ruled model of halfway with quadruple point top view diagonal view side view	Closed halfway top view diagonal view side view	Ruled model of death of triple points top view diagonal view side view
Ruled model of end of central intersection loop top view diagonal view side view	Ruled model of last stage top view diagonal view side view	

Nylon string open model

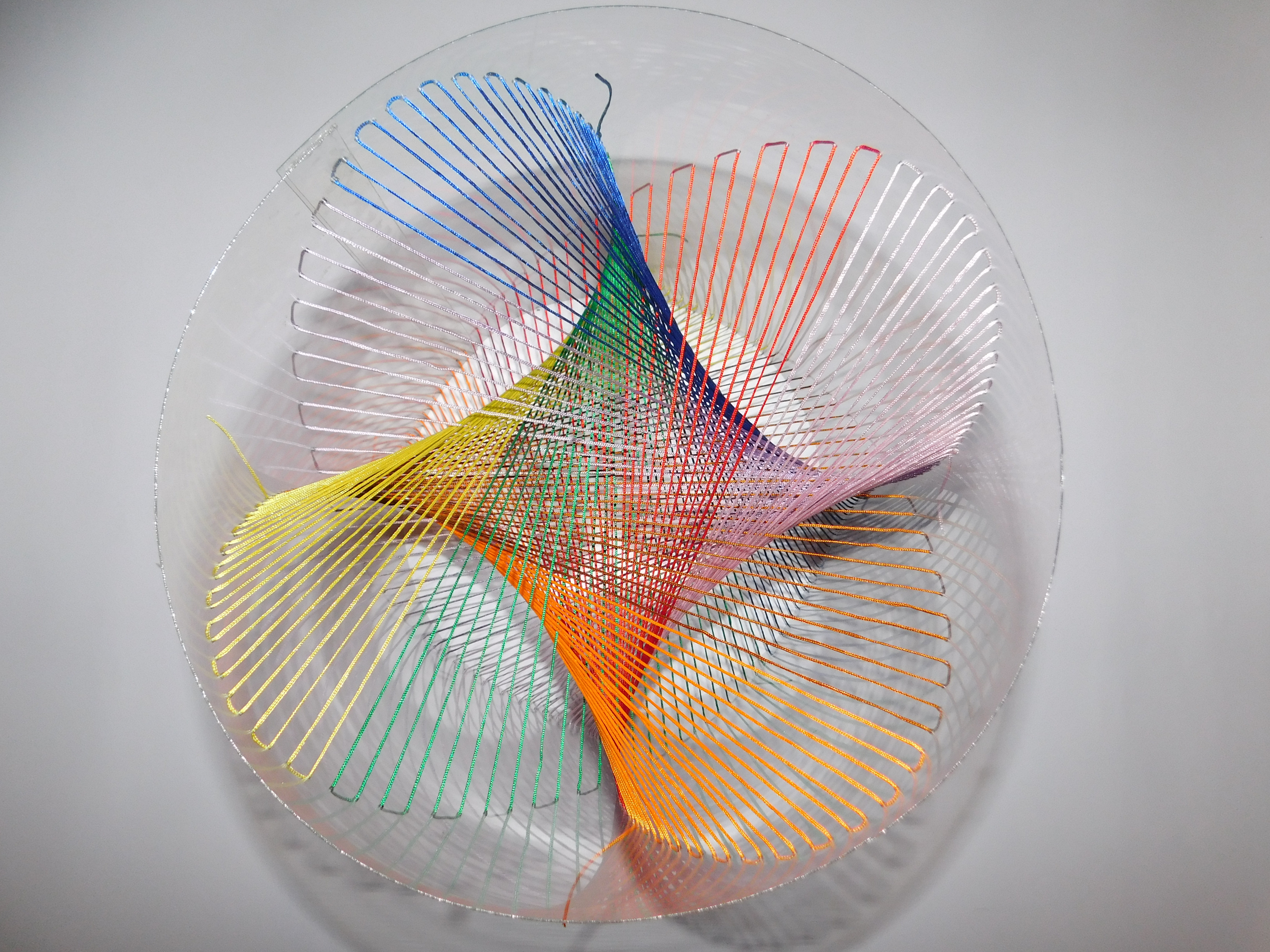
halfway top

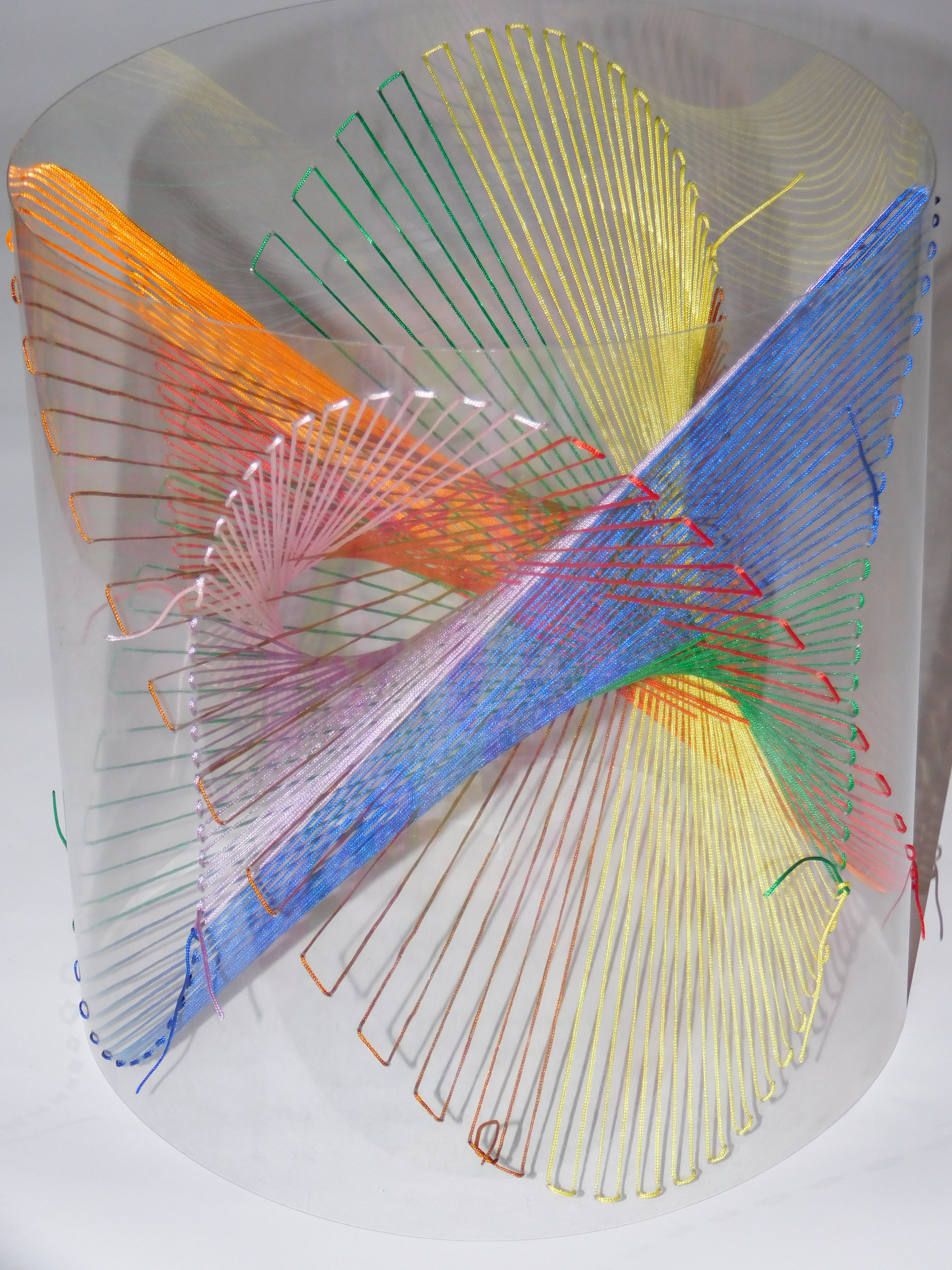
halfway side

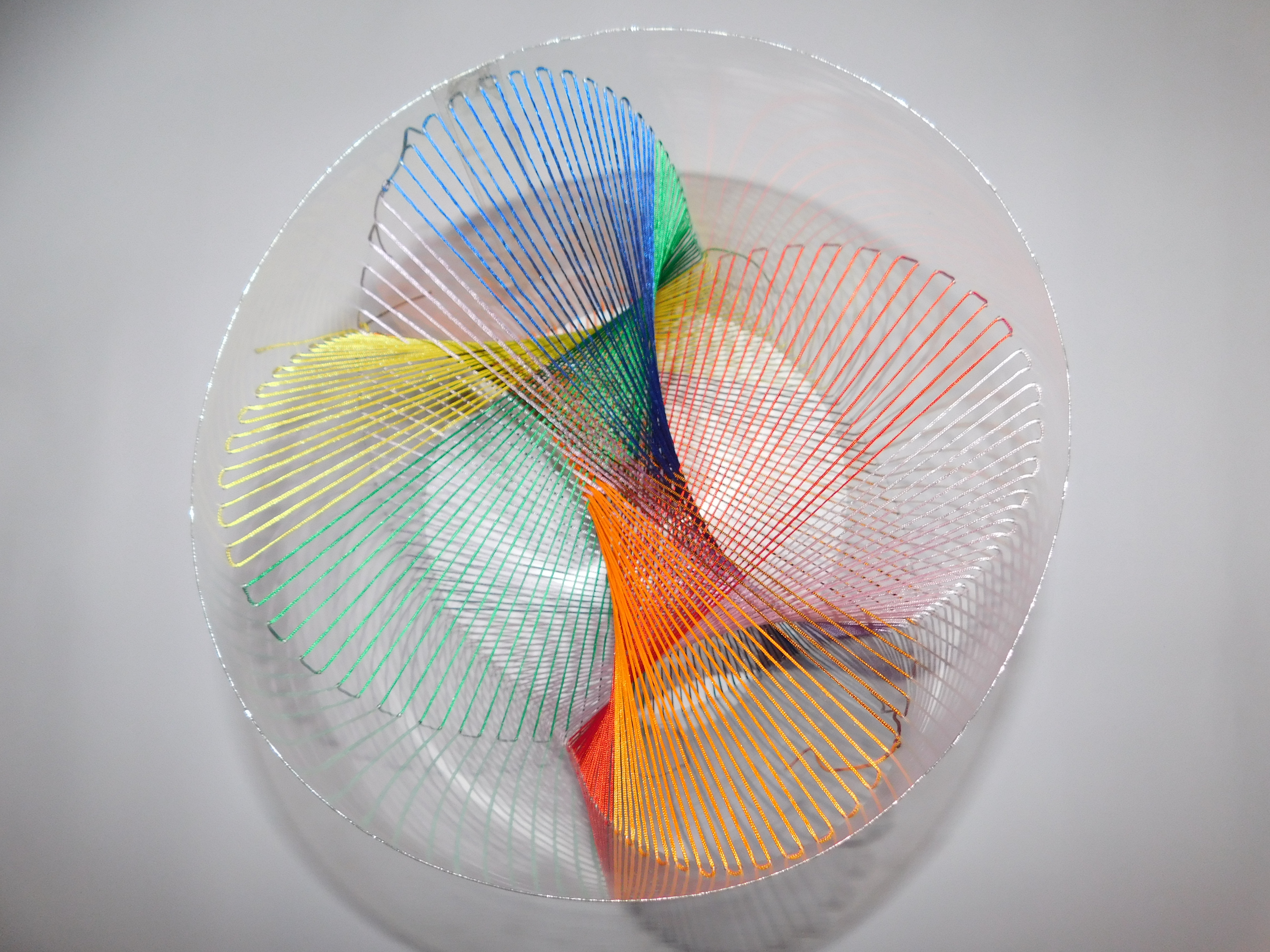
triple death top

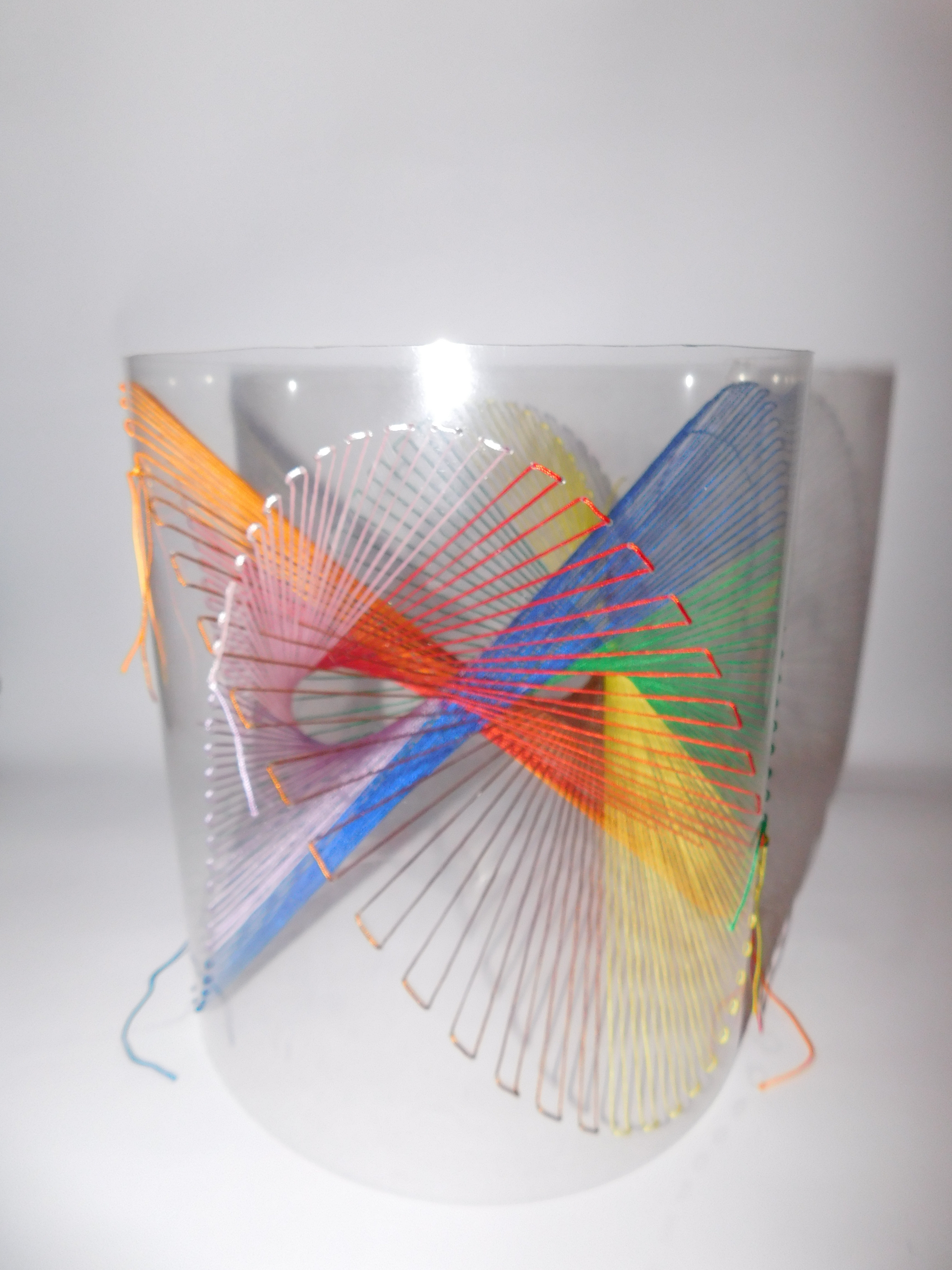
triple death side

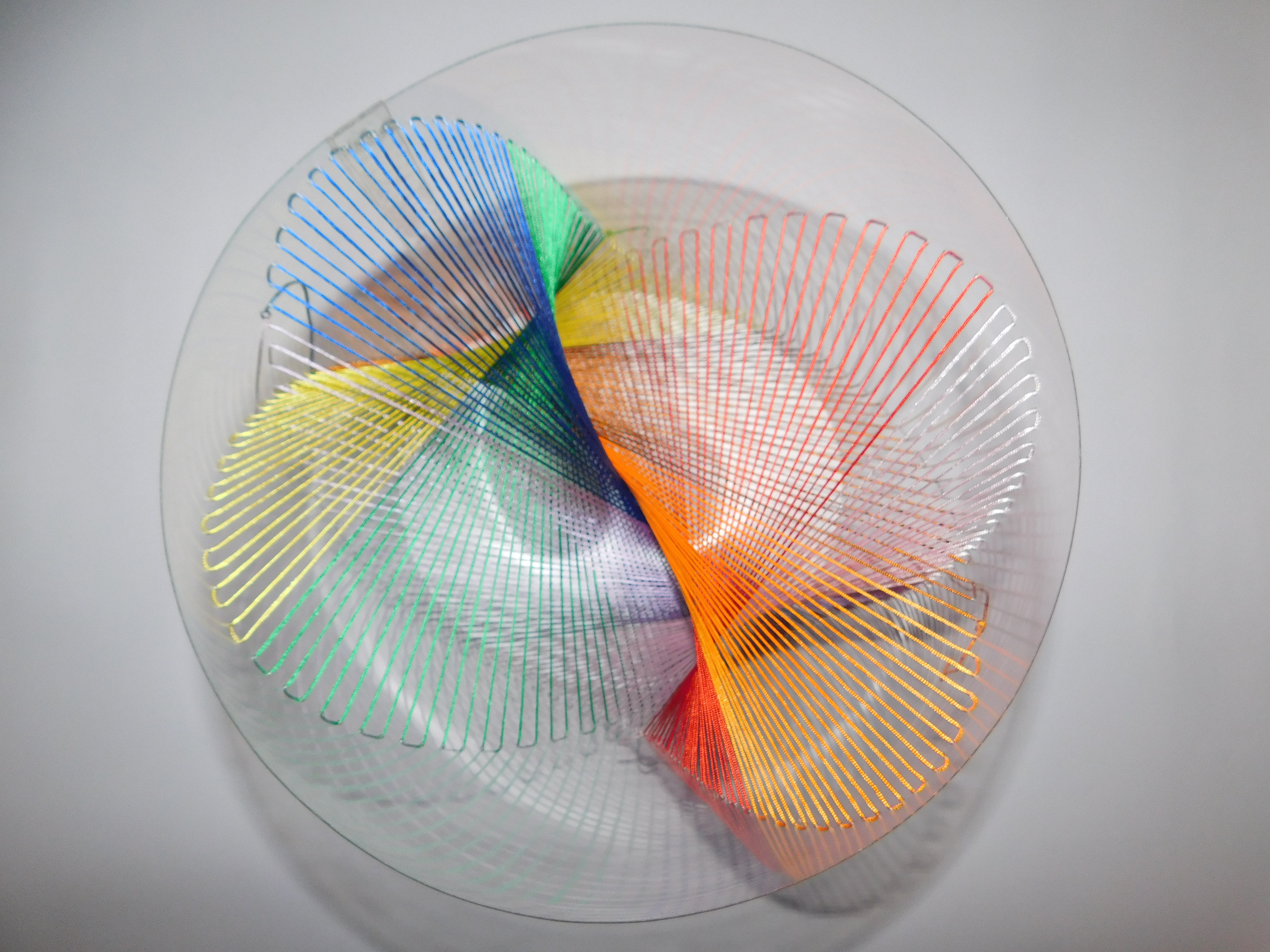
intersection end top

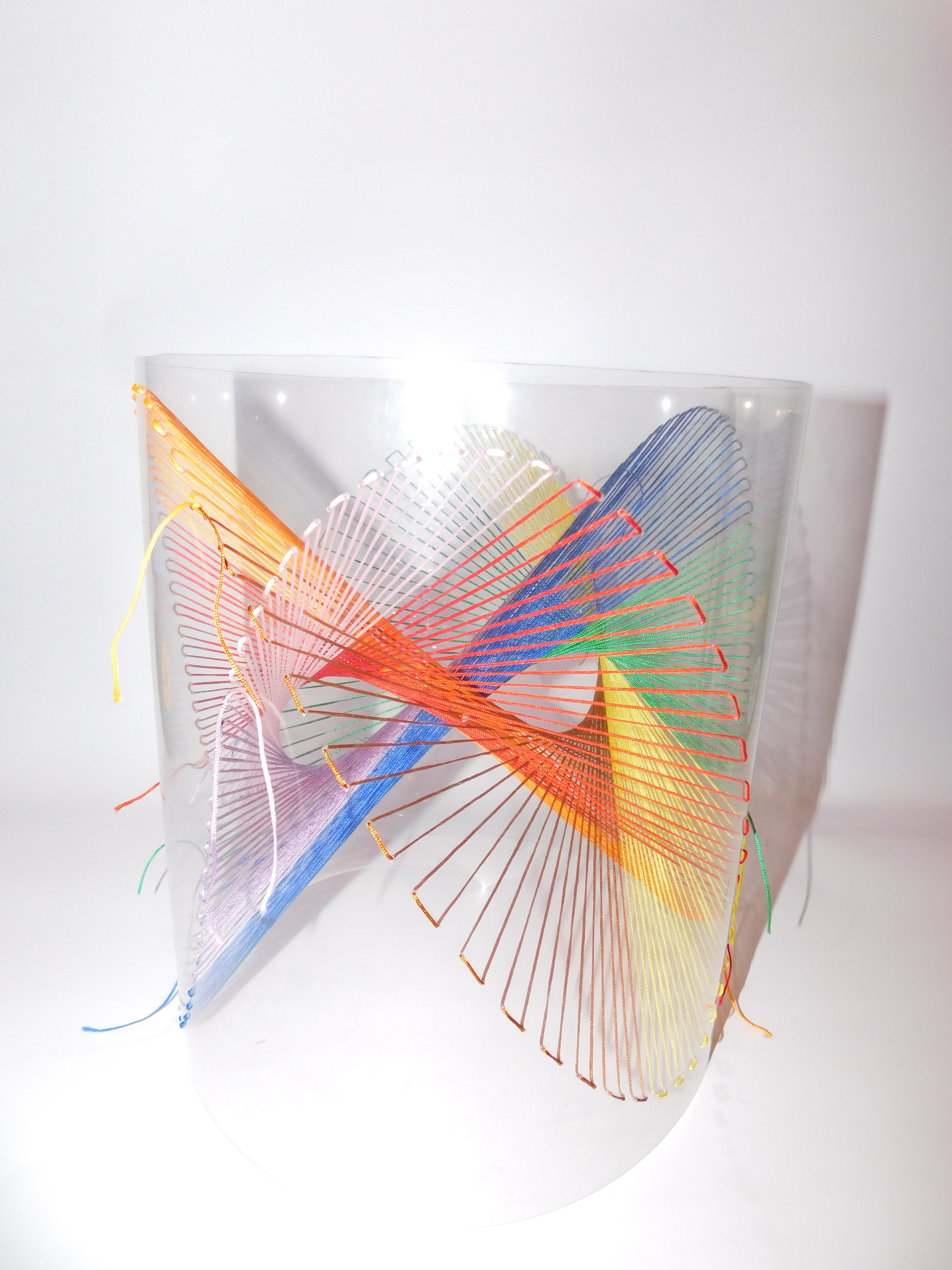
intersection end side

== See also ==
- Whitney–Graustein theorem
