= Boy's surface =

Self-intersecting compact surface, an immersion of the real projective plane

An animation of Boy's surface

In geometry, Boy's surface is an immersion of the real projective plane in three-dimensional space. It was discovered in 1901 by the German mathematician Werner Boy, who had been tasked by his doctoral thesis advisor David Hilbert to prove that the projective plane could not be immersed in three-dimensional space.

Boy's surface was first parametrized explicitly by Bernard Morin in 1978. Another parametrization was discovered by Rob Kusner and Robert Bryant. Boy's surface is one of the two possible immersions of the real projective plane which have only a single triple point.

Unlike the Roman surface and the cross-cap, it has no other singularities than self-intersections (that is, it has no pinch-points).

== Parametrization ==
A view of the Kusner–Bryant parametrization of the Boy's surface

Boy's surface can be parametrized in several ways. One parametrization, discovered by Rob Kusner and Robert Bryant, is the following: given a complex number w whose magnitude is less than or equal to one ($\| w \| \le 1$), let
$$\begin{align}
g_1 &= -{3 \over 2} \operatorname{Im} \left[ {w \left(1 - w^4\right) \over w^6 + \sqrt{5} w^3 - 1} \right]\\[4pt]
g_2 &= -{3 \over 2} \operatorname{Re} \left[ {w \left(1 + w^4\right) \over w^6 + \sqrt{5} w^3 - 1} \right]\\[4pt]
g_3 &= \operatorname{Im} \left[ {1 + w^6 \over w^6 + \sqrt{5} w^3 - 1}  \right] - {1 \over 2}\\
\end{align}$$

and then set
$$\begin{pmatrix}x\\ y\\ z\end{pmatrix} = \frac{1}{g_1^2 + g_2^2 + g_3^2} \begin{pmatrix}g_1\\ g_2\\ g_3\end{pmatrix}$$

we then obtain the Cartesian coordinates x, y, and z of a point on the Boy's surface.

If one performs an inversion of this parametrization centered on the triple point, one obtains a complete minimal surface with three ends (that's how this parametrization was discovered naturally). This implies that the Bryant–Kusner parametrization of Boy's surfaces is "optimal" in the sense that it is the "least bent" immersion of a projective plane into three-space.

=== Property of Bryant–Kusner parametrization ===
If w is replaced by the negative reciprocal of its complex conjugate, $-{1 \over w^\star},$ then the functions g_{1}, g_{2}, and g_{3} of w are left unchanged.

By replacing w in terms of its real and imaginary parts w = s + it, and expanding resulting parameterization, one may obtain a parameterization of Boy's surface in terms of rational functions of s and t. This shows that Boy's surface is not only an algebraic surface, but even a rational surface. The remark of the preceding paragraph shows that the generic fiber of this parameterization consists of two points (that is that almost every point of Boy's surface may be obtained by two parameters values).

=== Relation to the real projective plane ===
Let $P(w) = (x(w), y(w), z(w))$ be the Bryant–Kusner parametrization of Boy's surface. Then
$$P(w) = P\left(-{1 \over w^\star} \right).$$

This explains the condition $\left\| w \right\| \le 1$ on the parameter: if $\left\| w \right\| < 1,$ then $\left\| - {1 \over w^\star} \right\| > 1 .$ However, things are slightly more complicated for $\left\| w \right\| = 1.$ In this case, one has $-{1 \over w^\star} = -w .$ This means that, if $\left \| w \right\| = 1,$ the point of the Boy's surface is obtained from two parameter values: $P(w) = P(-w).$ In other words, the Boy's surface has been parametrized by a disk such that pairs of diametrically opposite points on the perimeter of the disk are equivalent. This shows that the Boy's surface is the image of the real projective plane, RP^{2} by a smooth map. That is, the parametrization of the Boy's surface is an immersion of the real projective plane into the Euclidean space.

Boy's surface also appears in a corresponding construction for the Klein bottle: the Ida surface, an immersion of the Klein bottle in three-dimensional space with no pinch points, is topologically the connected sum of two copies of Boy's surface, just as the Klein bottle is the connected sum of two copies of the real projective plane. It is obtained by applying to the Etruscan Venus, a singular Klein bottle analogous to Steiner's Roman surface, the same pinch-point-cancelling deformation that carries the Roman surface to Boy's surface.

== Symmetries ==
STL 3D model of Boy's surface

Boy's surface has 3-fold symmetry. This means that it has an axis of discrete rotational symmetry: any 120° turn about this axis will leave the surface looking exactly the same. The Boy's surface can be cut into three mutually congruent pieces.

== Applications ==
Boy's surface can be used in sphere eversion as a half-way model. A half-way model is an immersion of the sphere with the property that a rotation interchanges inside and outside, and so can be employed to evert (turn inside-out) a sphere. Boy's (the case p = 3) and Morin's (the case p = 2) surfaces begin a sequence of half-way models with higher symmetry first proposed by George Francis, indexed by the even integers 2p (for p odd, these immersions can be factored through a projective plane). Kusner's parametrization yields all these.

== Models ==
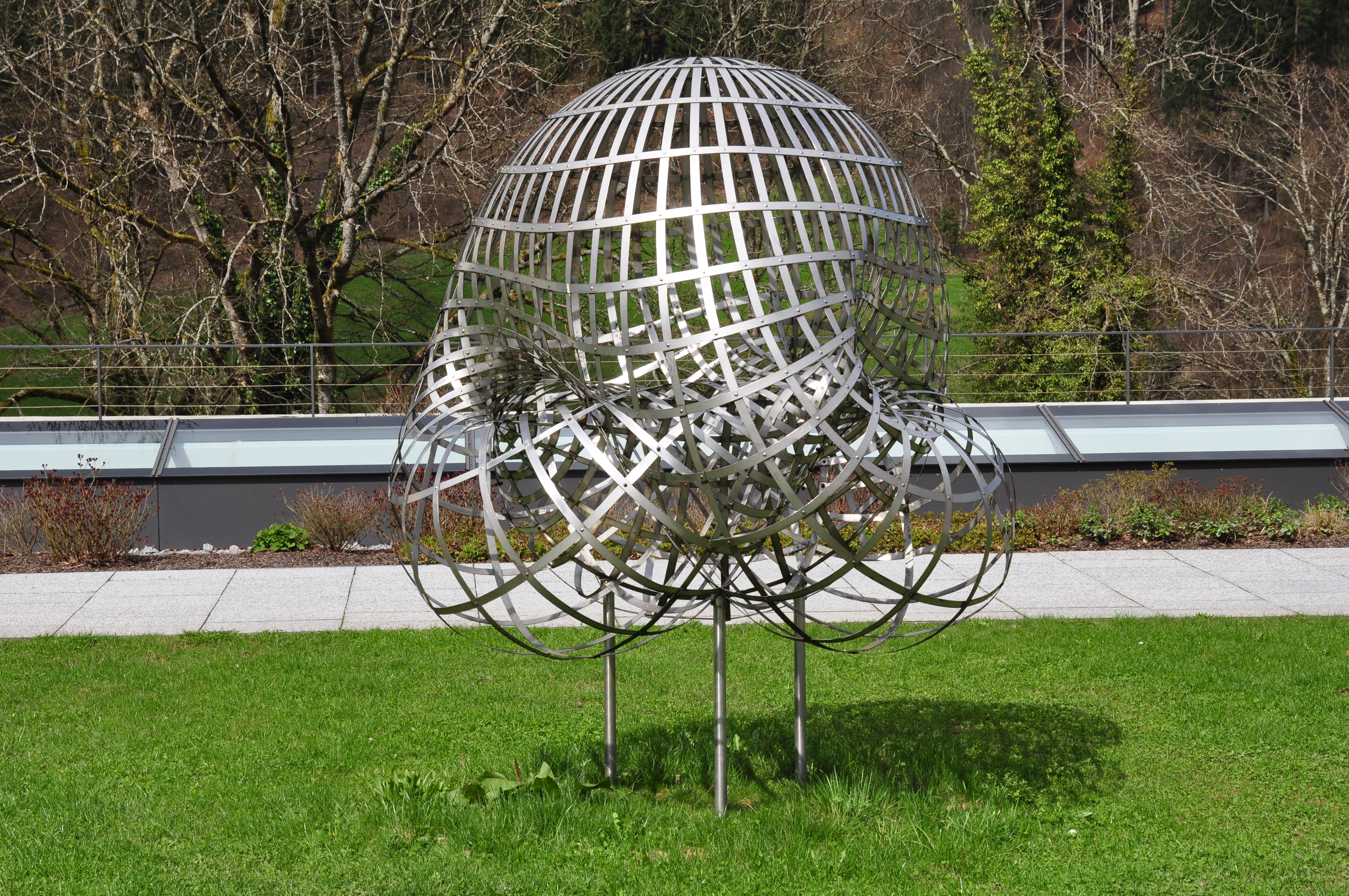
Model of a Boy's surface in Oberwolfach Research Institute for Mathematics

=== Model at Oberwolfach ===
The Oberwolfach Research Institute for Mathematics has a large model of a Boy's surface outside the entrance, constructed and donated by Mercedes-Benz in January 1991. This model has 3-fold rotational symmetry and minimizes the Willmore energy of the surface. It consists of steel strips representing the image of a polar coordinate grid under a parameterization given by Robert Bryant and Rob Kusner. The meridians (rays) become ordinary Möbius strips, i.e. twisted by 180 degrees. All but one of the strips corresponding to circles of latitude (radial circles around the origin) are untwisted, while the one corresponding to the boundary of the unit circle is a Möbius strip twisted by three times 180 degrees — as is the emblem of the institute (Mathematisches Forschungsinstitut Oberwolfach 2011).

=== Model made for Clifford Stoll ===
A model was made in glass by glassblower Lucas Clarke, with the cooperation of Adam Savage, for presentation to Clifford Stoll. It was featured on Adam Savage's YouTube channel, Tested. All three appeared in the video discussing it.
