= Werner Boy =

German mathematician (1879–1914)

- Born: 4 May 1879; Barmen, Rhine Province, German Empire
- Died: 6 September 1914 (aged 35) near Vitry-le-François, France
- Education: University of Göttingen
- Known for: Topology
- Scientific career
- Fields: Mathematician
- Doctoral advisor: David Hilbert

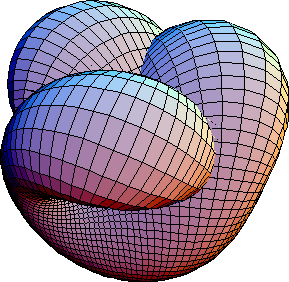
Boy's surface from near the top (R. Bryant's parameterization)

Werner Boy (German: [ˈvɛɹnɐ bɔɪ]; 4 May 1879 − 6 September 1914) was a German mathematician. He was the discoverer and eponym of Boy's surface—a three-dimensional projection of the real projective plane without singularities, the first of its kind. He discovered it in 1901 after his thesis adviser, David Hilbert, asked him to prove that it was not possible to immerse the real projective plane in three-dimensional space. Boy sketched several models of the surface, and discovered that it could have 3-fold rotational symmetry, but was unable to find a parametric model for the surface. It was not until 1978 that Bernard Morin found the first parametrisation, with the aid of computers.

After completing his dissertation, Boy worked as a high school teacher in Krefeld, Germany. He later returned to his birth town of Barmen (today Wuppertal) to teach. He died as a soldier in the first weeks of World War I on 6 September 1914.
