= Mathematical visualization =

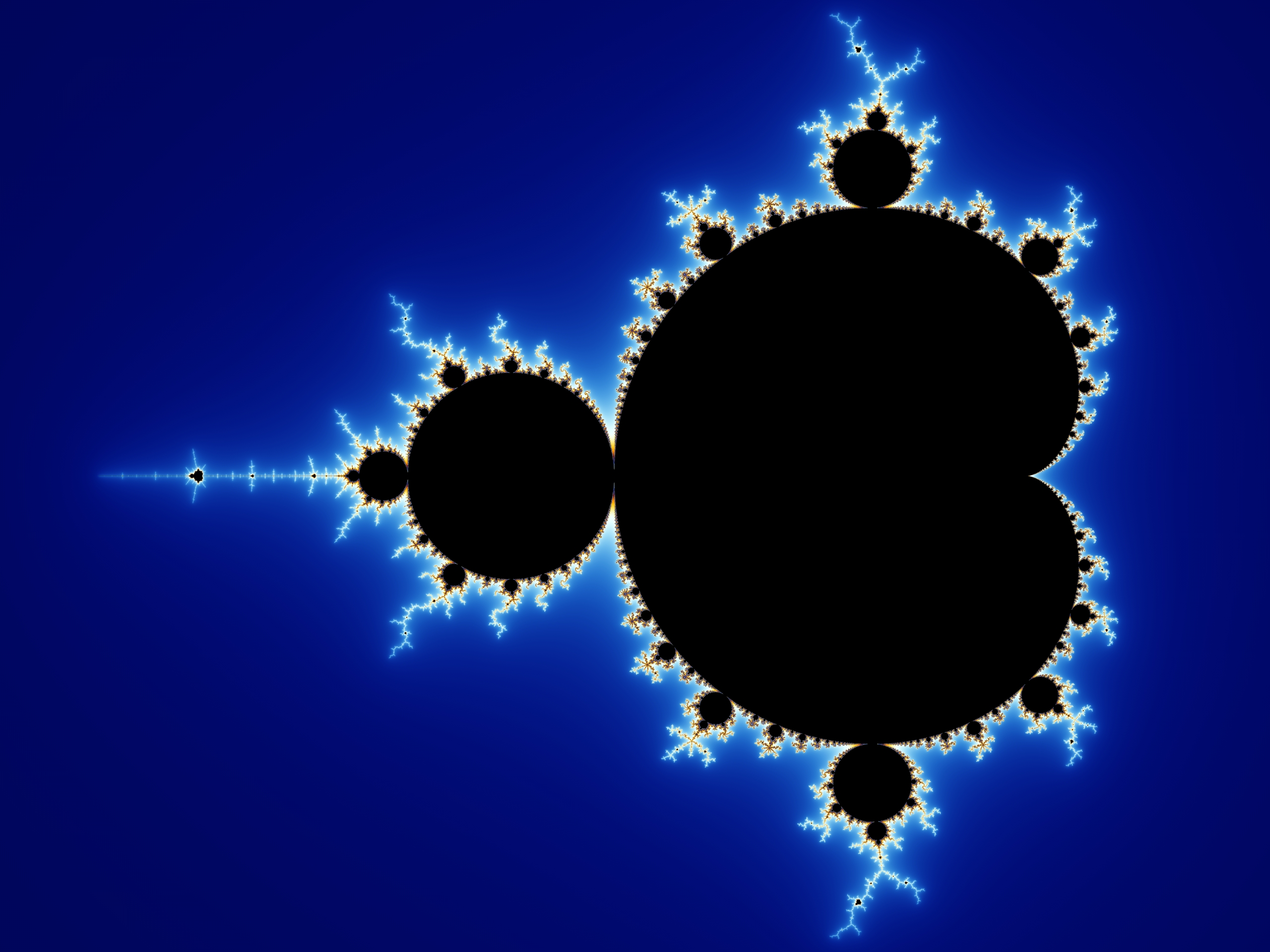
The Mandelbrot set, one of the most famous examples of mathematical visualization.

Mathematical phenomena can be understood and explored via visualization. Classically, this consisted of two-dimensional drawings or building three-dimensional models (particularly plaster models in the 19th and early 20th century). In contrast, today it most frequently consists of using computers or calculators to make static two- or three-dimensional drawings, animations, or interactive programs. Writing software programs to visualize mathematics is an aspect of computational geometry.

== Applications ==
Mathematical visualization is used throughout mathematics, particularly in the fields of geometry and analysis. Notable examples include plane curves, space curves, polyhedra, ordinary differential equations, partial differential equations (particularly numerical solutions, as in fluid dynamics or minimal surfaces such as soap films), conformal maps, fractals, and chaos. Visualization is mostly helpful in understanding a problem and many methods can be applied to visualize almost all branches in mathematics. Visualization cannot be used as proof in mathematics but is often used to demonstrate changes and steps in proofs.

=== Geometry ===
An illustration of Desargues' theorem, an important result in Euclidean and projective geometry

Geometry can be defined as the study of shapes their size, angles, dimensions and proportions. The visualization of geometry, geometrical problems, proofs, expressions etc. often accompany the topics. Various parts of geometry are reliant on visualization. In non-Euclidean geometry and other such fields where mathematical approaches needn't make sense intuitively, visualization helps.

Before the advent of computer graphics, visualization of geometry was mostly done by 2D-drawings by hand for a long time. One notable example is The First Six Books of the Elements of Euclid (1847) by Oliver Byrne who used an innovative colour-coding technique to explain Euclidean proofs. Since the 1960s advancements in computational power have led to the development of increasingly powerful geometrical calculators and visualizers whose purposes extend beyond mathematics and plays more of a fundamental role in many industries.

=== Linear algebra ===
In three-dimensional Euclidean space, these three planes represent solutions of linear equations, and their intersection represents the set of common solutions: in this case, a unique point. The blue line is the common solution to two of these equations.

Linear algebra is the branch of mathematics that deals with linear equations, inequalities, linear maps etc. Visualization of algebra is mostly done using graphs, using points, lines, areas etc. to represent various parameters of problems. Graphing calculators can take inputs as expressions and plot graphs that visualize their functions. Desmos is a browser based graphing calculator.

=== Complex analysis ===
Domain coloring of: f(x) = ((x^{2}−1)(x−2−i)^{2})/(x^{2}+2+2i)

In complex analysis, functions of the complex plane are inherently 4-dimensional, but there is no natural geometric projection into lower dimensional visual representations. Instead, colour vision is exploited to capture dimensional information using techniques such as domain coloring.

=== Chaos theory ===
A plot of the Lorenz attractor for values r = 28, σ = 10, b = 8/3

Chaos theory is a branch of mathematics that deals with understanding non-linear systems and initial conditions, it deals with random and unpredictable behavior. Visualizations in chaos theory are done mostly using bifurcation diagrams and phase plots.

=== Topology ===
A table of all prime knots with seven crossings or fewer (not including mirror images

Many people have vivid mental imagination for topology and how topology interacts with the world. The inability to render a strong mental image is known as aphantasia, some experience extraordinarily strong mental imagery, called hyperphantasia. Researchers are studying how these two conditions arise through changes in the wiring of the brain.

Visualization played an important role at the beginning of topological knot theory, when polyhedral decompositions were used to compute the homology of covering spaces of knots. Extending to 3 dimensions the physically impossible Riemann surfaces used to classify all closed orientable 2-manifolds, Heegaard's 1898 thesis "looked at" similar structures for functions of two complex variables, taking an imaginary 4-dimensional surface in Euclidean 6-space (corresponding to the function f=x^2-y^3) and projecting it stereographically (with multiplicities) onto the 3-sphere. In the 1920s Alexander and Briggs used this technique to compute the homology of cyclic branched covers of knots with 8 or fewer crossings, successfully distinguishing them all from each other (and the unknot). By 1932 Reidemeister extended this to 9 crossings, relying on linking numbers between branch curves of non-cyclic knot covers. The fact that these imaginary objects have no "real" existence does not stand in the way of their usefulness for proving knots distinct. It was the key to Perko's 1973 discovery of the duplicate knot type in Little's 1899 table of 10-crossing knots.

=== Graph theory ===
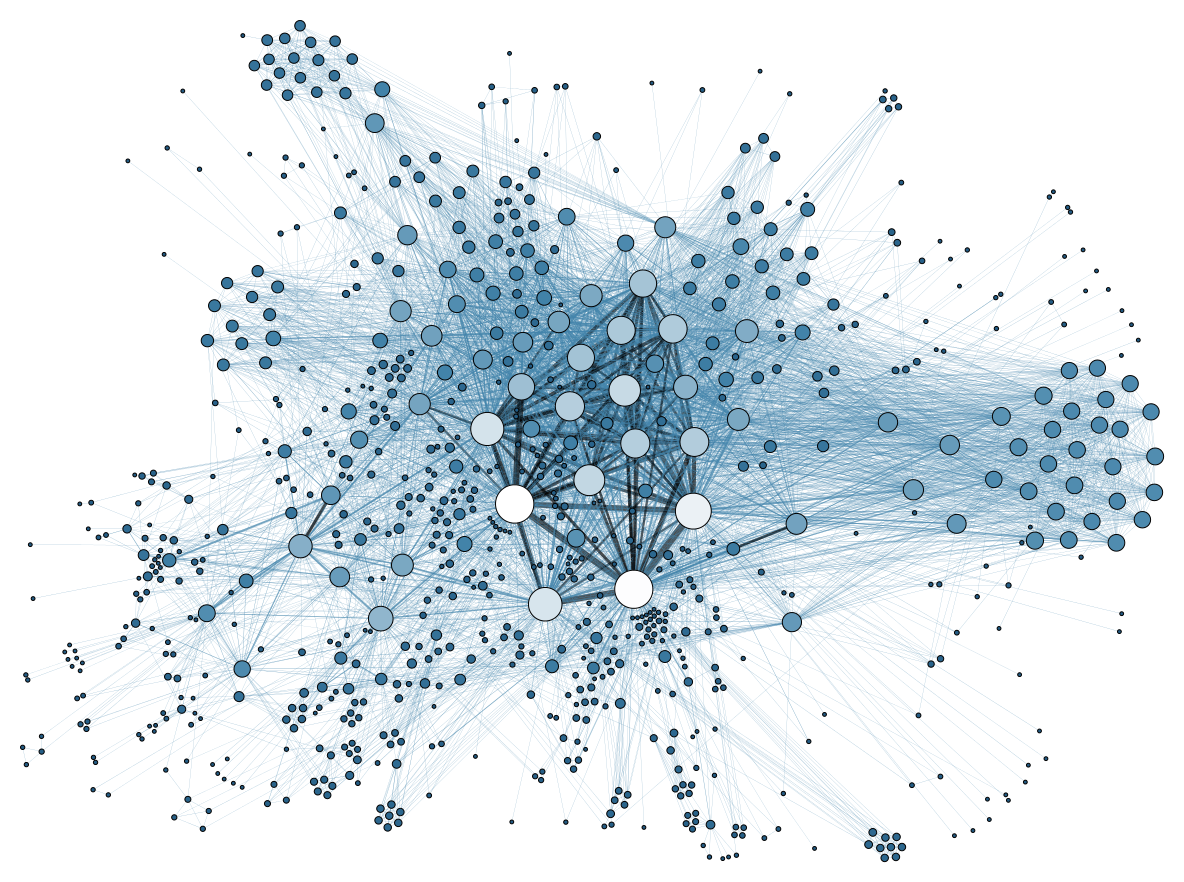
A force-based network visualization.

Permutation groups have nice visualizations of their elements that assist in explaining their structure—e.g., the rotated and flipped regular p-gons that comprise the dihedral group of order 2p. They may be used to "see" the relationships among linking numbers between branch curves of dihedral covering spaces of knots and links.

=== Combinatorics ===
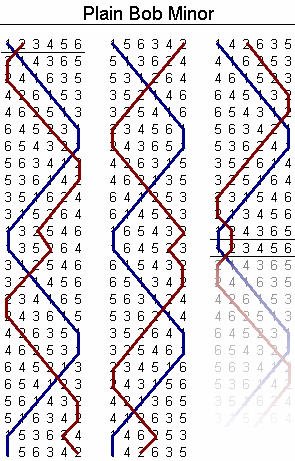
An example of change ringing (with six bells), one of the earliest nontrivial results in graph theory.

=== Cellular automata ===
Gosper's Glider Gun creating "gliders" in the cellular automaton Conway's Game of Life

Stephen Wolfram's book on cellular automata, A New Kind of Science (2002), is one of the most intensely visual books published in the field of mathematics. It has been criticized for being too heavily visual, with much information conveyed by pictures that do not have formal meaning.

=== Computation ===
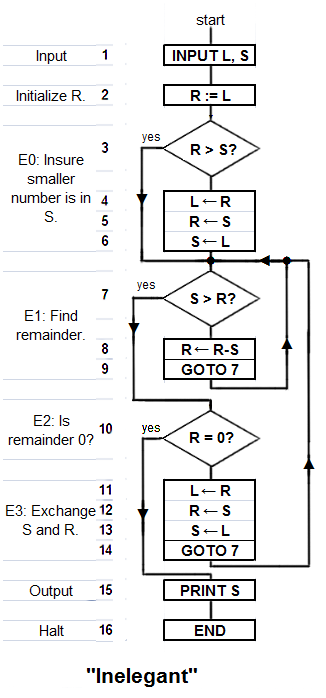
"Inelegant" is a translation of Knuth's version of the algorithm with a subtraction-based remainder-loop replacing his use of division (or a "modulus" instruction). Derived from Knuth 1973:2–4.

=== Other examples ===
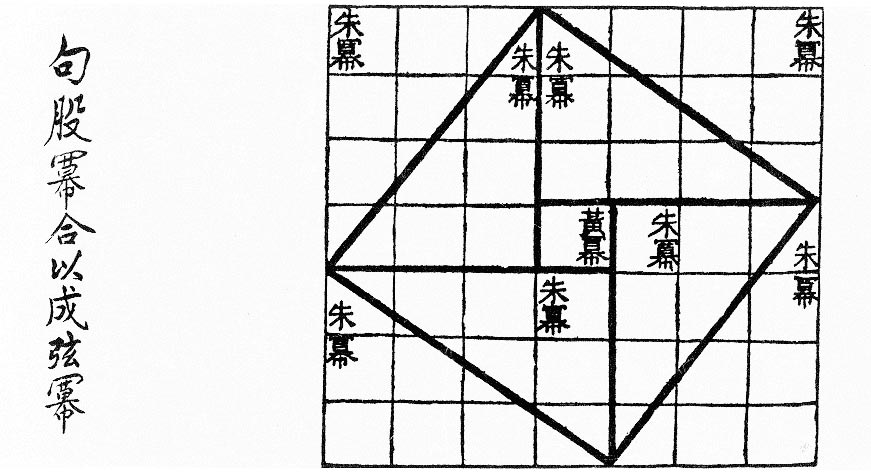
A proof without words of the Pythagorean theorem in Zhoubi Suanjing.

- Proofs without words have existed since antiquity, as in the Pythagorean theorem proof found in the Zhoubi Suanjing Chinese text which dates from 1046 BC to 256 BC.
- The Clebsch diagonal surface demonstrates the 27 lines on a cubic surface.

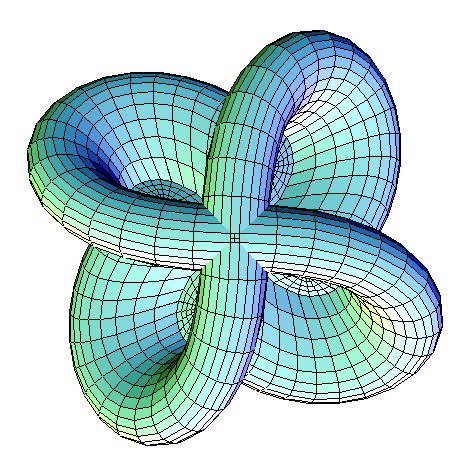
A Morin surface, the half-way stage in turning a sphere inside out.

- Sphere eversion – that a sphere can be turned inside out in 3 dimension if allowed to pass through itself, but without kinks – was a startling and counter-intuitive result, originally proven via abstract means, later demonstrated graphically, first in drawings, later in computer animation.

The cover of the journal The Notices of the American Mathematical Society regularly features a mathematical visualization.

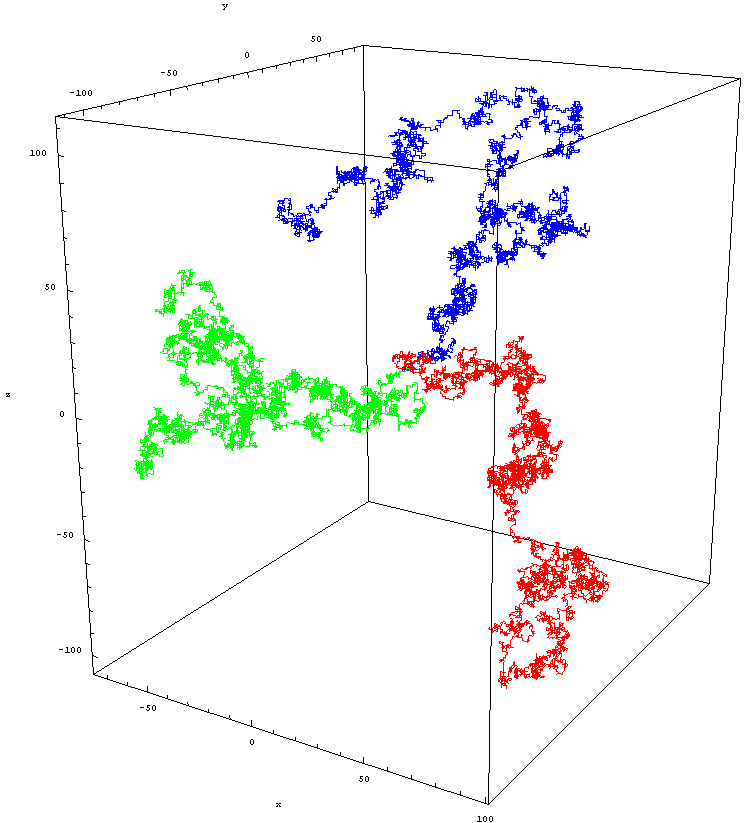
Three random walks

== See also ==
- Geometry Center
- Mathematical diagram
- Parametric surface
- List of mathematical art software
