= Minimax eversion =

In geometry, minimax eversions are a class of sphere eversions, constructed by using half-way models.

It is a variational method, and consists of special homotopies (they are shortest paths with respect to Willmore energy); contrast with Thurston's corrugations, which are generic.

The original method of half-way models was not optimal: the regular homotopies passed through the midway models, but the path from the round sphere to the midway model was constructed by hand, and was not gradient ascent/descent.

Eversions via half-way models are called tobacco-pouch eversions by Francis and Morin.

== Half-way models ==
A half-way model is an immersion of the sphere $S^2$ in $\R^3$, which is so-called because it is the half-way point of a sphere eversion. This class of eversions has time symmetry: the first half of the regular homotopy goes from the standard round sphere to the half-way model, and the second half (which goes from the half-way model to the inside-out sphere) is the same process in reverse.

== Explanation ==
Minimax sphere eversion; see the video's Wikimedia Commons page for a description of the video's contents

Rob Kusner proposed optimal eversions using the Willmore energy on the space of all immersions of the sphere $S^2$ in $\mathbf{R}^3$. The round sphere and the inside-out round sphere are the unique global minima for Willmore energy, and a minimax eversion is a path connecting these by passing over a saddle point (like traveling between two valleys via a mountain pass).

Kusner's half-way models are saddle points for Willmore energy, arising (according to a theorem of Bryant) from certain complete minimal surfaces in 3-space; the minimax eversions consist of gradient ascent from the round sphere to the half-way model, then gradient descent down (gradient descent for Willmore energy is called Willmore flow). More symmetrically, start at the half-way model; push in one direction and follow Willmore flow down to a round sphere; push in the opposite direction and follow Willmore flow down to the inside-out round sphere.

There are two families of half-way models (this observation is due to Francis and Morin):

- odd order: generalizing Boy's surface: 3-fold, 5-fold, etc., symmetry; half-way model is a double-covered projective plane (generically 2-1 immersed sphere).
- even order: generalizing Morin surface: 2-fold, 4-fold, etc., symmetry; half-way model is a generically 1-1 immersed sphere, and a twist by half a symmetry interchanges sheets of the sphere

== History ==
The first explicit sphere eversion was by Shapiro and Phillips in the early 1960s, using Boy's surface as a half-way model. Later Morin discovered the Morin surface and used it to construct other sphere eversions. Kusner conceived the minimax eversions in the early 1980s: historical details.
