= Homotopy principle =

Partial differential equation technique

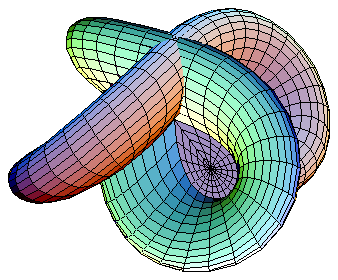
The homotopy principle generalizes such results as Smale's proof of sphere eversion.

In mathematics, the homotopy principle (or h-principle) is a very general way to solve partial differential equations (PDEs), and more generally partial differential relations (PDRs). The h-principle is good for underdetermined PDEs or PDRs, such as the immersion problem, isometric immersion problem, fluid dynamics, and other areas.

The theory was started by Yakov Eliashberg, Mikhail Gromov and Anthony V. Phillips. It was based on earlier results that reduced partial differential relations to homotopy, particularly for immersions. The first evidence of h-principle appeared in the Whitney–Graustein theorem. This was followed by the Nash–Kuiper isometric $C^1$ embedding theorem and the Smale–Hirsch immersion theorem.

== Rough idea ==
Assume we want to find a function $f$ on $\R^m$ which satisfies a partial differential equation of degree $k$, in coordinates $(u_1,u_2,\dots,u_m)$. One can rewrite it as

$$\Psi(u_1,u_2,\dots,u_m, J^k_f)=0 ,$$

where $J^k_f$ stands for all partial derivatives of $f$ up to order $k$. Exchanging every variable in $J^k_f$ for new independent variables $y_1,y_2,\dots,y_N$ turns our equations into

$$\Psi^{}_{}(u_1,u_2,\dots,u_m,y_1,y_2,\dots,y_N)=0$$

and some number of equations of the type

$$y_j={\partial^k f\over \partial u_{j_1}\ldots\partial u_{j_k}}.$$

A solution of

$$\Psi^{}_{}(u_1,u_2,\dots,u_m,y_1,y_2,\dots,y_N)=0$$

is called a non-holonomic solution, and a solution of the system which is also solution of our original PDE is called a holonomic solution.

In order to check whether a solution to our original equation exists, one can first check if there is a non-holonomic solution. Usually this is quite easy, and if there is no non-holonomic solution, then our original equation did not have any solutions.

A PDE satisfies the $h$-principle if any non-holonomic solution can be deformed into a holonomic one in the class of non-holonomic solutions. Thus in the presence of h-principle, a differential topological problem reduces to an algebraic topological problem. More explicitly this means that apart from the topological obstruction there is no other obstruction to the existence of a holonomic solution. The topological problem of finding a non-holonomic solution is much easier to handle and can be addressed with the obstruction theory for topological bundles.

While many underdetermined partial differential equations satisfy the h-principle, the falsity of one is also an interesting statement. Intuitively this means that the objects being studied have non-trivial geometry which cannot be reduced to topology. As an example, embedded Lagrangians in a symplectic manifold do not satisfy an h-principle, to prove this one can for instance find invariants coming from pseudo-holomorphic curves.

== Simple examples ==
=== Monotone functions ===
Perhaps the simplest partial differential relation is for the derivative to not vanish: $f'(x) \neq 0$. Properly, this is an ordinary differential relation, as this is a function in one variable.

A holonomic solution to this relation is a function whose derivative is nowhere vanishing, i.e. a strictly monotone differentiable function, either increasing or decreasing. The space of such functions consists of two disjoint convex sets: the increasing ones and the decreasing ones, and has the homotopy type of two points.

A non-holonomic solution to this relation would consist in the data of two functions, a differentiable function $f(x)$, and a continuous function $g(x)$, with $g(x)$ nowhere vanishing. A holonomic solution gives rise to a non-holonomic solution by taking $g(x) = f'(x)$. The space of non-holonomic solutions again consists of two disjoint convex sets, according as $g(x)$ is positive or negative.

Thus the inclusion of holonomic into non-holonomic solutions satisfies the h-principle.

The Whitney–Graustein theorem shows that immersions of the circle in the plane satisfy an h-principle, expressed by turning number.

This trivial example has nontrivial generalizations: extending this to immersions of a circle into itself classifies them by order (or winding number), by lifting the map to the universal covering space and applying the above analysis to the resulting monotone map – the linear map corresponds to multiplying angle: $\theta \mapsto n\theta$ ($z \mapsto z^n$ in complex numbers). Note that here there are no immersions of order $0$, as those would need to turn back on themselves. Extending this to circles immersed in the plane – the immersion condition is precisely the condition that the derivative does not vanish – the Whitney–Graustein theorem classified these by turning number by considering the homotopy class of the Gauss map and showing that this satisfies an h-principle; here again order $0$ is more complicated.

Smale's classification of immersions of spheres as the homotopy groups of Stiefel manifolds, and Hirsch's generalization of this to immersions of manifolds being classified as homotopy classes of maps of frame bundles are much further-reaching generalizations, and much more involved, but similar in principle – immersion requires the derivative to have rank $k$, which requires the partial derivatives in each direction to not vanish and to be linearly independent, and the resulting analog of the Gauss map is a map to the Stiefel manifold, or more generally between frame bundles.

=== A car in the plane ===
As another simple example, consider a car moving in the plane. The position of a car in the plane is determined by three parameters: two coordinates $x$ and $y$ for the location (a good choice is the location of the midpoint between the back wheels) and an angle $\alpha$ which describes the orientation of the car. The motion of the car satisfies the equation

$$\dot x \sin\alpha=\dot y\cos \alpha ,$$

since a non-skidding car must move in the direction of its wheels. In robotics terms, not all paths in the task space are holonomic.

A non-holonomic solution in this case, roughly speaking, corresponds to a motion of the car by sliding in the plane. In this case the non-holonomic solutions are not only homotopic to holonomic ones but also can be arbitrarily well approximated by the holonomic ones (by going back and forth, like parallel parking in a limited space) – note that this approximates both the position and the angle of the car arbitrarily closely. This implies that, theoretically, it is possible to parallel park in any space longer than the length of your car. It also implies that, in a contact 3 manifold, any curve is $C^0$-close to a Legendrian curve. This last property is stronger than the general h-principle; it is called the $C^0$-dense h-principle.

While this example is simple, compare to the Nash embedding theorem, specifically the Nash–Kuiper theorem, which says that any short smooth ($C^\infty$) embedding or immersion of $M^m$ in $\mathbf{R}^{m+1}$ or larger can be arbitrarily well approximated by an isometric $C^1$-embedding (respectively, immersion). This is also a dense h-principle, and can be proven by an essentially similar "wrinkling" – or rather, circling – technique to the car in the plane, though it is much more involved.

== Ways to prove the h-principle ==
- Removal of Singularities technique developed by Gromov and Eliashberg
- Sheaf technique based on the work of Smale and Hirsch.
- Convex integration based on the work of Nash and Kuiper.

== Some paradoxes ==
Here we list a few counter-intuitive results which can be proved by applying the h-principle:

- Cone eversion. Consider the function $f$ on $\mathbb{R}^2 \smallsetminus \{0\}$ with $f(x) = \vert x \vert$. Then there is a continuous one-parameter family of functions $f_t$ such that $f_0=f$, $f_1=-f$ and for any $t$, $\operatorname{grad}(f_t)$ is not zero at any point.
- Any open manifold admits a (non-complete) Riemannian metric of positive (or negative) curvature.
- Sphere eversion without creasing or tearing can be done using $C^1$ immersions of $S^2$.
- The Nash-Kuiper $C^1$ isometric embedding theorem, in particular implies that there is a $C^1$ isometric immersion of the round $S^2$ into an arbitrarily small ball of $\R^3$. This immersion cannot be $C^2$ because a small oscillating sphere would provide a large lower bound for the principal curvatures, and therefore for the Gauss curvature of the immersed sphere, but on the other hand if the immersion is $C^2$ this has to be equal to 1 everywhere, the Gauss curvature of the standard $S^2$, by Gauss's Theorema Egregium.
