= Bernard Morin =

French mathematician (1931–2018)

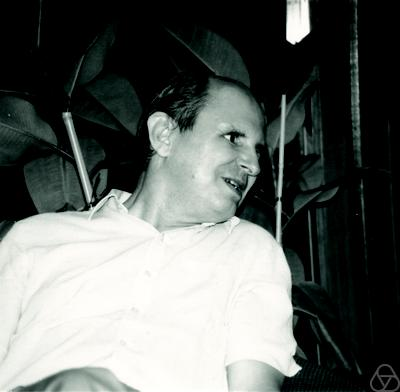
- Born: 3 March 1931; Shanghai, China
- Died: 12 March 2018 (aged 87); Paris, France
- Education: École Normale Supérieure; Centre National de la Recherche Scientifique
- Scientific career
- Fields: Mathematics; Topology
- Workplaces: Institute for Advanced Study; University of Strasbourg
- Doctoral advisor: René Thom

Looping animated cutaway view of Boy's surface.

Bernard Morin (French: [mɔʁɛ̃]; 3 March 1931 in Shanghai, China – 12 March 2018) was a French mathematician, specifically a topologist.

== Early life and education ==
Morin lost his sight at the age of six due to glaucoma, but his blindness did not prevent him from having a successful career in mathematics. He received his Ph.D. in 1972 from the Centre National de la Recherche Scientifique.

== Career ==
Morin was a member of the group that first exhibited an eversion of the sphere, i.e., a homotopy which starts with a sphere and ends with the same sphere but turned inside-out. He also discovered the Morin surface, which is a half-way model for the sphere eversion, and used it to prove a lower bound on the number of steps needed to turn a sphere inside out.

Morin discovered the first parametrization of Boy's surface (earlier used as a half-way model), in 1978. His graduate student François Apéry, in 1986, discovered another parametrization of Boy's surface, which conforms to the general method for parametrizing non-orientable surfaces.

Morin worked at the Institute for Advanced Study in Princeton, New Jersey. Most of his career, though, he spent at the University of Strasbourg.

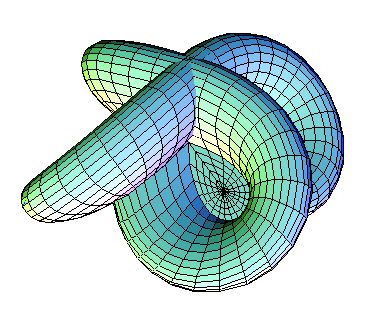

Morin's surface.

== See also ==
- Blind mathematicians: Leonhard Euler, Nicholas Saunderson, Lev Pontryagin, Louis Antoine
