= Willmore energy =

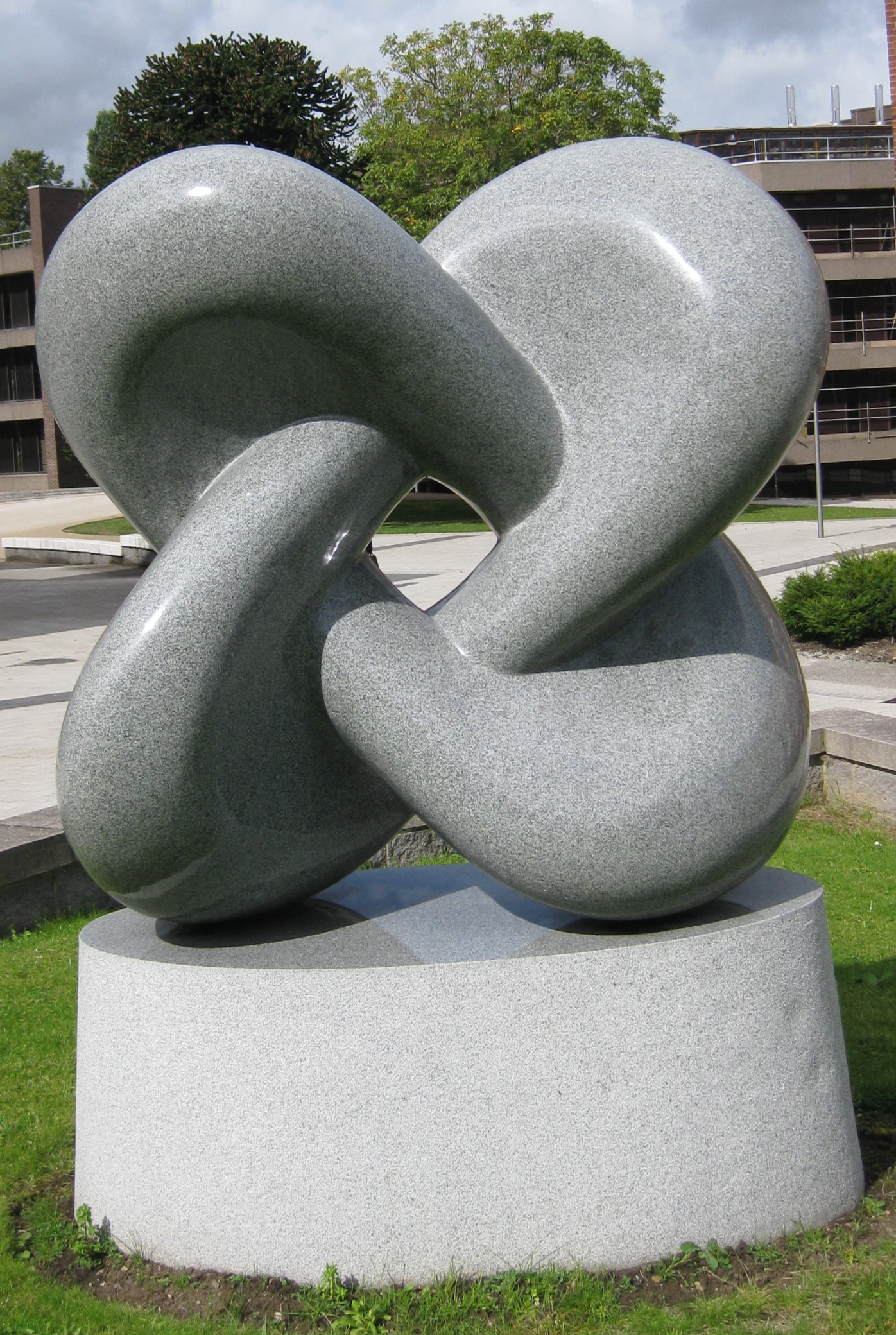
"Willmore Surface" sculpture at Durham University in memory of Thomas Willmore

In differential geometry, the Willmore energy is a quantitative measure of how much a given surface deviates from a round sphere. Mathematically, the Willmore energy of a smooth closed surface embedded in three-dimensional Euclidean space is defined to be the integral of the square of the mean curvature minus the Gaussian curvature. It is named after the English geometer Thomas Willmore.

== Definition ==
Expressed symbolically, the Willmore energy of S is:

$$\mathcal{W} = \int_S H^2 \, dA - \int_S K \, dA$$

where $H$ is the mean curvature, $K$ is the Gaussian curvature, and dA is the area form of S. For a closed surface, by the Gauss–Bonnet theorem, the integral of the Gaussian curvature may be computed in terms of the Euler characteristic $\chi(S)$ of the surface, so

$$\int_S K \, dA = 2 \pi \chi(S),$$

which is a topological invariant and thus independent of the particular embedding in $\mathbb{R}^3$ that was chosen. Thus the Willmore energy can be expressed as

$$\mathcal{W} = \int_S H^2 \, dA - 2 \pi \chi(S)$$

An alternative, but equivalent, formula is

$$\mathcal{W} = {1 \over 4} \int_S (k_1 - k_2)^2 \, dA$$

where $k_1$ and $k_2$ are the principal curvatures of the surface.

=== Properties ===
The Willmore energy is always greater than or equal to zero. A round sphere has zero Willmore energy.

The Willmore energy can be considered a functional on the space of embeddings of a given surface, in the sense of the calculus of variations, and one can vary the embedding of a surface, while leaving it topologically unaltered.

The form $(k_1-k_2)^2 \, dA$ is unchanged after a conformal transformation, so the value of the Willmore energy is conformally invariant.

== Critical points ==
A basic problem in the calculus of variations is to find the critical points and minima of a functional. The critical points of Willmore energy are called Willmore surfaces.

For a given topological space, this is equivalent to finding the critical points of the function

$$\int_S H^2 \, dA$$

since the Euler characteristic is constant.

One can find (local) minima for the Willmore energy by gradient descent, which in this context is called Willmore flow.

For embeddings of the sphere in 3-space, the critical points have been classified: they are all equivalent to minimal surfaces by a conformal transformation, the round sphere is the minimum, and all other critical values are integer multiples of 4$\pi$.

== Willmore flow ==
The Willmore flow is the geometric flow corresponding to the Willmore energy; it is an $L^2$-gradient flow.

$$e[{\mathcal{M}}]=\frac{1}{2} \int_{\mathcal{M}} H^2\, \mathrm{d}A$$

where H stands for the mean curvature of the manifold $\mathcal{M}$.

Flow lines satisfy the differential equation:

$$\partial_t x(t) = -\nabla \mathcal{W}[x(t)] \,$$

where $x$ is a point belonging to the surface.

This flow leads to an evolution problem in differential geometry: the surface $\mathcal{M}$ is evolving in time to follow variations of steepest descent of the energy. Like surface diffusion it is a fourth-order flow, since the variation of the energy contains fourth derivatives.

== Applications ==
- In general relativity, the Willmore energy arises in the study of quasi-local notions of gravitational mass. In particular, surfaces that are critical points of the Willmore energy under an area constraint, known as area-constrained Willmore surfaces, play a role in the analysis of the Hawking quasi-local energy, where they provide geometrically distinguished families for studying properties such as positivity, monotonicity, and asymptotic behavior.
- Cell membranes tend to position themselves so as to minimize Willmore energy.
- Willmore energy is used in constructing a class of optimal sphere eversions, the minimax eversions.

== See also ==
- Willmore conjecture
