= Tri-State Conference =

Tri-State Conference may refer to several American college sports conferences:

- Tri-State Conference (1923–1934), Ohio, Pennsylvania, West Virginia
- Tri-State Conference (1932–1939), later known as Badger-Illini Conference, Illinois, Iowa, Wisconsin
- Tri-State Conference (1960–1981), Iowa, Nebraska, Minnesota, South Dakota
- Tri-State Athletic Conference (1988–1989), Iowa, Nebraska, South Dakota
