= Tripoint (disambiguation) =

A tripoint is a geographical point at which the borders of three countries or regions meet.

Tripoint may also refer to:

- Triple divide, a point where three drainage basins meet
- Tri-point screw drive and head
- Tripoint (novel), a 1994 work of science fiction by C. J. Cherryh

== See also ==
- Trig point
- Triple point
