= Stiefel manifold =

Manifold of all orthonormal k-frames in n-dimensional Euclidean space

In mathematics, the Stiefel manifold $V_k(\R^n)$ is the set of all orthonormal k-frames in $\R^n$; that is, the set of ordered orthonormal k-tuples of vectors in $\R^n.$ It is named after Swiss mathematician Eduard Stiefel. Likewise one can define the complex Stiefel manifold $V_k(\Complex^n)$ of orthonormal k-frames in $\Complex^n$ and the quaternionic Stiefel manifold $V_k(\mathbb{H}^n)$ of orthonormal k-frames in $\mathbb{H}^n$. More generally, the construction applies to any real, complex, or quaternionic inner product space.

In some contexts, a non-compact Stiefel manifold is defined as the set of all linearly independent k-frames in $\R^n, \Complex^n,$ or $\mathbb{H}^n;$ this is homotopy equivalent to the more restrictive definition, as the compact Stiefel manifold is a deformation retract of the non-compact one, by employing the Gram–Schmidt process. Statements about the non-compact form correspond to those for the compact form, replacing the orthogonal group (or unitary or symplectic group) with the general linear group.

== Topology ==
Let $\mathbb{F}$ stand for $\R,\Complex,$ or $\mathbb{H}.$ The Stiefel manifold $V_k(\mathbb F^n)$ can be thought of as a set of n × k matrices by writing a k-frame as a matrix of k column vectors in $\mathbb F^n.$ The orthonormality condition is expressed by A*A = $I_k$ where A* denotes the conjugate transpose of A and $I_k$ denotes the k × k identity matrix. We then have

$$V_k(\mathbb F^n) = \left\{A \in \mathbb F^{n\times k} : A^* A = I_k \right\}.$$

The topology on $V_k(\mathbb F^n)$ is the subspace topology inherited from $\mathbb{F}^{n\times k}.$ With this topology $V_k(\mathbb F^n)$ is a compact manifold whose dimension is given by

$$\begin{align}
\dim V_k(\R^n) &= nk - \frac{1}{2}k(k+1) \\
\dim V_k(\Complex^n) &= 2nk - k^2 \\
\dim V_k(\mathbb{H}^n) &= 4nk - k(2k-1)
\end{align}$$

== As a homogeneous space ==
Each of the Stiefel manifolds $V_k(\mathbb F^n)$ can be viewed as a homogeneous space for the action of a classical group in a natural manner.

Every orthogonal transformation of a k-frame in $\R^n$ results in another k-frame, and any two k-frames are related by some orthogonal transformation. In other words, the orthogonal group O(n) acts transitively on $V_k(\R^n).$ The stabilizer subgroup of a given frame is the subgroup isomorphic to O(n−k) which acts nontrivially on the orthogonal complement of the space spanned by that frame.

Likewise the unitary group U(n) acts transitively on $V_k(\Complex^n)$ with stabilizer subgroup U(n−k) and the symplectic group Sp(n) acts transitively on $V_k(\mathbb{H}^n)$ with stabilizer subgroup Sp(n−k).

In each case $V_k(\mathbb F^n)$ can be viewed as a homogeneous space:

$$\begin{align}
V_k(\R^n) &\cong \mbox{O}(n)/\mbox{O}(n-k)\\
V_k(\Complex^n) &\cong \mbox{U}(n)/\mbox{U}(n-k)\\
V_k(\mathbb{H}^n) &\cong \mbox{Sp}(n)/\mbox{Sp}(n-k)
\end{align}$$

When k = n, the corresponding action is free so that the Stiefel manifold $V_n(\mathbb F^n)$ is a principal homogeneous space for the corresponding classical group.

When k is strictly less than n then the special orthogonal group SO(n) also acts transitively on $V_k(\R^n)$ with stabilizer subgroup isomorphic to SO(n−k) so that

$$V_k(\R^n) \cong \mbox{SO}(n)/\mbox{SO}(n-k)\qquad\mbox{for } k < n.$$

The same holds for the action of the special unitary group on $V_k(\Complex^n)$

$$V_k(\Complex^n) \cong \mbox{SU}(n)/\mbox{SU}(n-k)\qquad\mbox{for } k < n.$$

Thus for k ≤ n − 1, the Stiefel manifold is a principal homogeneous space for the corresponding special classical group.

== Uniform measure ==
The Stiefel manifold can be equipped with a uniform measure, i.e. a Borel measure that is invariant under the action of the groups noted above. For example, $V_1(\R^2)$ which is isomorphic to the unit circle in the Euclidean plane, has as its uniform measure the natural uniform measure (arc length) on the circle. It is straightforward to sample this measure on $V_k(\mathbb F^n)$ using Gaussian random matrices: if $A\in\mathbb{F}^{n\times k}$ is a random matrix with independent entries identically distributed according to the standard normal distribution on $\mathbb{F}$ and A = QR is the QR factorization of A, then the matrices, $Q\in\mathbb{F}^{n\times k}, R\in\mathbb{F}^{k\times k}$ are independent random variables and Q is distributed according to the uniform measure on $V_k(\mathbb F^n).$ This result is a consequence of the Bartlett decomposition theorem.

== Special cases ==
A 1-frame in $\mathbb{F}^n$ is nothing but a unit vector, so the Stiefel manifold $V_1(\mathbb F^n)$ is just the unit sphere in $\mathbb{F}^n.$ Therefore:

$$\begin{align}
V_1(\R^n) &= S^{n-1}\\
V_1(\Complex^n) &= S^{2n-1}\\
V_1(\mathbb{H}^n) &= S^{4n-1}
\end{align}$$

Given a 2-frame in $\R^n,$ let the first vector define a point in S^{n−1} and the second a unit tangent vector to the sphere at that point. In this way, the Stiefel manifold $V_2(\R^n)$ may be identified with the unit tangent bundle to S^{n−1}.

When k = n or n−1 we saw in the previous section that $V_k(\mathbb{F}^n)$ is a principal homogeneous space, and therefore diffeomorphic to the corresponding classical group:

$$\begin{align}
V_{n-1}(\R^n) &\cong \mathrm{SO}(n)\\
V_{n-1}(\Complex^n) &\cong \mathrm{SU}(n)
\end{align}$$

$$\begin{align}
V_{n}(\R^n) &\cong \mathrm O(n)\\
V_{n}(\Complex^n) &\cong \mathrm U(n)\\
V_{n}(\mathbb{H}^n) &\cong \mathrm{Sp}(n)
\end{align}$$

== Functoriality ==
Given an orthogonal inclusion between vector spaces $X \hookrightarrow Y,$ the image of a set of k orthonormal vectors is orthonormal, so there is an induced closed inclusion of Stiefel manifolds, $V_k(X) \hookrightarrow V_k(Y),$ and this is functorial. More subtly, given an n-dimensional vector space X, the dual basis construction gives a bijection between bases for X and bases for the dual space $X^*,$ which is continuous, and thus yields a homeomorphism of top Stiefel manifolds $V_n(X) \stackrel{\sim}{\to} V_n(X^*).$ This is also functorial for isomorphisms of vector spaces.

== As a principal bundle ==
There is a natural projection

$$p : V_k(\mathbb F^n) \to G_k(\mathbb F^n)$$

from the Stiefel manifold $V_k(\mathbb F^n)$ to the Grassmannian of k-planes in $\mathbb{F}^n$ which sends a k-frame to the subspace spanned by that frame. The fiber over a given point P in $G_k(\mathbb F^n)$ is the set of all orthonormal k-frames contained in the space P.

This projection has the structure of a principal G-bundle where G is the associated classical group of degree k. Take the real case for concreteness. There is a natural right action of O(k) on $V_k(\R^n)$ which rotates a k-frame in the space it spans. This action is free but not transitive. The orbits of this action are precisely the orthonormal k-frames spanning a given k-dimensional subspace; that is, they are the fibers of the map p. Similar arguments hold in the complex and quaternionic cases.

We then have a sequence of principal bundles:

$$\begin{align}
\mathrm O(k)   &\to V_k(\R^n) \to G_k(\R^n)\\
\mathrm U(k)   &\to V_k(\Complex^n) \to G_k(\Complex^n)\\
\mathrm{Sp}(k) &\to V_k(\mathbb{H}^n) \to G_k(\mathbb{H}^n)
\end{align}$$

The vector bundles associated to these principal bundles via the natural action of G on $\mathbb{F}^k$ are just the tautological bundles over the Grassmannians. In other words, the Stiefel manifold $V_k(\mathbb F^n)$ is the orthogonal, unitary, or symplectic frame bundle associated to the tautological bundle on a Grassmannian.

When one passes to the $n\to \infty$ limit, these bundles become the universal bundles for the classical groups.

== Homotopy ==
The Stiefel manifolds fit into a family of fibrations:

$$V_{k-1}(\R^{n-1}) \to V_k(\R^n) \to S^{n-1},$$

thus the first non-trivial homotopy group of the space $V_k(\R^n)$ is in dimension n − k. Moreover,

$$\pi_{n-k} V_k(\R^n) \simeq \begin{cases} \Z & n-k>0 \text{ even or } k=1 \\ \Z_2 & n-k \text{ odd and } k>1 \text{ or }k=n\end{cases}$$

This result is used in the obstruction-theoretic definition of Stiefel–Whitney classes.

== Riemannian optimization and retractions ==
The Stiefel manifold $V_k(\mathbb{R}^n)$ is widely utilized in Riemannian manifold optimization, where smooth functions are minimized subject to the orthonormality constraint $X^T X = I_k$. Algorithms such as Riemannian gradient descent (RGD) and Riemannian conjugate gradient update an iterate $X \in V_k(\mathbb{R}^n)$ along a tangent vector $\xi \in T_X V_k(\mathbb{R}^n)$ by means of a retraction mapping $R_X: T_X V_k(\mathbb{R}^n) \to V_k(\mathbb{R}^n)$.

Common retractions include:

- Polar retraction:

$$R_X(\xi) = (X + \xi)(I_k + \xi^T \xi)^{-1/2}$$

- QR decomposition retraction:

$$R_X(\xi) = \operatorname{qf}(X + \xi)$$

where $\operatorname{qf}(A)$ denotes the $Q$ factor from the thin QR decomposition of $A$.

- Cayley transform: An intrinsic retraction preserving orthogonality via skew-symmetric matrix exponentials or Cayley resolvents.

== See also ==
- Flag manifold
- Matrix Langevin distribution
