= Circular symmetry =

Property of a planar object which maps onto itself after rotation by any angle

In 2-dimensions an archery target has circular symmetry.	A surface of revolution has circular symmetry around an axis in 3-dimensions.

In geometry, circular symmetry is a type of continuous symmetry for a planar object that can be rotated by any arbitrary angle and map onto itself.

Rotational circular symmetry is isomorphic with the circle group in the complex plane, or the special orthogonal group SO(2), and unitary group U(1). Reflective circular symmetry is isomorphic with the orthogonal group O(2).

== Two dimensions ==
A 2-dimensional object with circular symmetry would consist of concentric circles and annular domains.

Rotational circular symmetry has all cyclic symmetry, Z_{n} as subgroup symmetries. Reflective circular symmetry has all dihedral symmetry, Dih_{n} as subgroup symmetries.

== Three dimensions ==
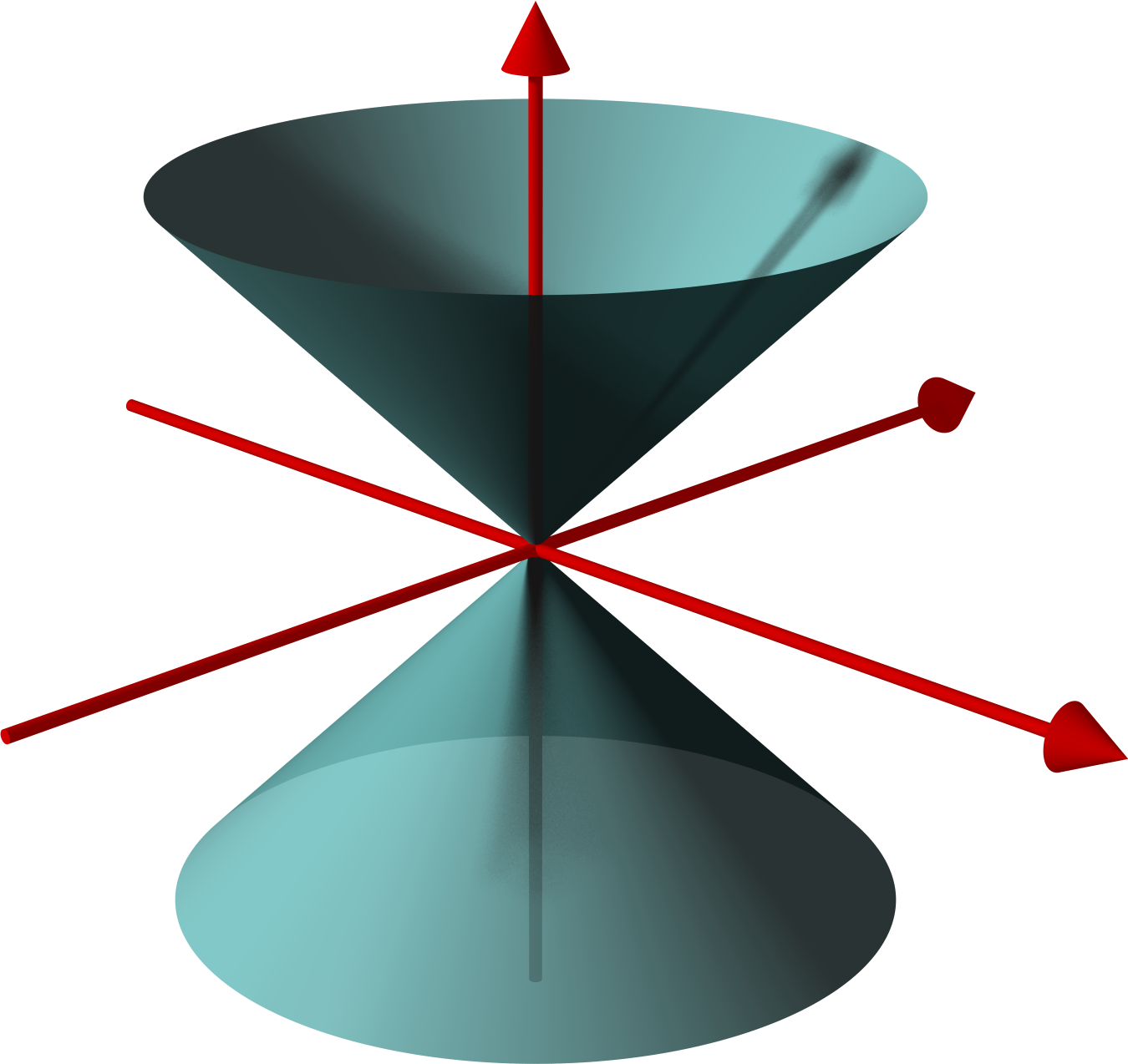
A double-cone is a surface of revolution, generated by a line.

In 3-dimensions, a surface or solid of revolution has circular symmetry around an axis, also called cylindrical symmetry or axial symmetry. An example is a right circular cone. Circular symmetry in 3 dimensions has all pyramidal symmetry, C_{nv} as subgroups.

A double-cone, bicone, cylinder, toroid and spheroid have circular symmetry, and in addition have a bilateral symmetry perpendicular to the axis of system (or half cylindrical symmetry). These reflective circular symmetries have all discrete prismatic symmetries, D_{nh} as subgroups.

== Four dimensions ==
Clifford torus stereographic projections
(simple)	1:5	5:1
Cylindrical	Duocylindrical	

In four dimensions, an object can have circular symmetry, on two orthogonal axis planes, or duocylindrical symmetry. For example, the duocylinder and Clifford torus have circular symmetry in two orthogonal axes. A spherinder has spherical symmetry in one 3-space, and circular symmetry in the orthogonal direction.

== Spherical symmetry ==
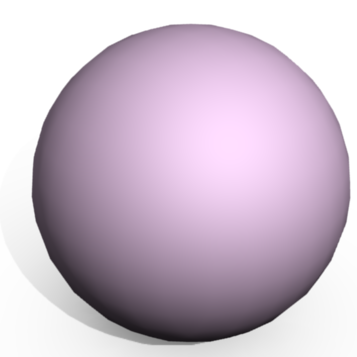
An unmarked sphere has reflectional spherical symmetry.

An analogous 3-dimensional equivalent term is spherical symmetry.

Rotational spherical symmetry is isomorphic with the rotation group SO(3), and can be parametrized by the Davenport chained rotations pitch, yaw, and roll. Rotational spherical symmetry has all the discrete chiral 3D point groups as subgroups. Reflectional spherical symmetry is isomorphic with the orthogonal group O(3) and has the 3-dimensional discrete point groups as subgroups.

A scalar field has spherical symmetry if it depends on the distance to the origin only, such as the potential of a central force. A vector field has spherical symmetry if it is in radially inward or outward direction with a magnitude and orientation (inward/outward) depending on the distance to the origin only, such as a central force.

== See also ==
- Isotropy
- Rotational symmetry
- Particle in a spherically symmetric potential
- Gauss's theorem
