= Ida surface =

Immersion of the Klein bottle

Rotating animation of the Ida surface, a three-dimensional shadow of a four-dimensional Klein bottle.

In topology, the branch of mathematics concerned with the properties of shapes that are preserved under continuous deformations such as stretching, twisting, and bending, the Ida surface is a three-dimensional shadow of a four-dimensional Klein bottle. The Klein bottle is a non-orientable surface that has no distinct interior or exterior — meaning it has only a single side. It represents a closed 2-dimensional manifold that can only be constructed without self-intersection in four or more dimensions. A manifold is a shape that, viewed up close at any one of its points, looks just like a small patch of ordinary flat space, the way the curved surface of the Earth looks flat to a person standing on it; a 2-dimensional manifold is closed if it is finite in extent and has no boundary edge. Any depiction of the Klein bottle that can be rendered in ordinary three-dimensional space must therefore pass through itself somewhere. Such a surface is best understood as a shadow — mathematically, a projection of the four-dimensional original into our three-dimensional space, much as the shadow a physical object casts on a wall is a two-dimensional projection of its three-dimensional form. Consequently, the places where the surface crosses itself are artifacts of the projection rather than features of the surface itself.

As a shadow of the Klein bottle, the Ida surface passes through itself only along smooth curves, and it contains none of the pinch points (described below) that appear in most classical one-sided surfaces. A self-crossing surface of this kind is called an immersion. The surface was derived mathematically by the mathematician George K. Francis. The Ida surface is the namesake of Ray Idaszak, who was the first person to see it: the surface became visible only when rendered with a shading algorithm of his own invention for displaying one-sided surfaces. The work was carried out by a three-person team at the National Center for Supercomputing Applications (NCSA) in Urbana, Illinois, with artist and visualization researcher Donna Cox, whose contributions included the aesthetic shading and color used to render the surface and who helped bring the work to a wider audience.

The Ida surface is the end state of a two-parameter family of surfaces $F(\ell, b)$ swept out by deforming plane ovals. The same family contains several classical surfaces: Steiner's Roman surface is $F(0,0)$, Boy's surface is $F(0,1)$, the Etruscan Venus is $F(1,0)$, and the Ida surface is $F(1,1)$. Topologically, the Ida surface is the connected sum of two copies of Boy's surface, just as the Klein bottle is the connected sum of two copies of the real projective plane.

== History ==
The Ida surface was discovered in the mid-1980s at the National Center for Supercomputing Applications (NCSA) in Urbana, Illinois, by a three-person team: the mathematician George K. Francis, the artist and visualization researcher Donna Cox, and the computer scientist and visualization researcher Ray Idaszak. The project set out to visualize the Romboy homotopy — the deformation, parametrized by François Apéry, that carries Steiner's Roman surface to Boy's surface — and extended it to the Klein-bottle analogue now called the Etruscan Venus. Applying Apéry's pinch-point cancellation to the Venus produced a new immersion of the Klein bottle, the Ida surface, whose namesake, Ray Idaszak, was the first to see it on the computer screen.

The surface emerged from a rendering method Idaszak devised for displaying one-sided surfaces (described below), and contemporary accounts present the surface and the algorithm together. The work was rendered on NCSA supercomputers and shown publicly in the SIGGRAPH 1988 Technical Slide Show under the title "Romboy Homotopy"; the same image appeared on the cover of the August 1989 issue of Computer, the magazine of the IEEE Computer Society. A narrated videotape by Francis, Cox and Idaszak, The Etruscan Venus, was published by the Association for Computing Machinery in 1989 in SIGGRAPH Video Review no. 49. The science writer Ivars Peterson described the project in Science News in 1987 and again in his 1990 book Islands of Truth, on whose cover the surface appears. The surface is also treated in Francis's A Topological Picturebook and in his chapter "The Etruscan Venus."

== Background ==
A surface is one-sided, or non-orientable, if an ant walking along it can return to its starting point standing on the opposite side, without ever crossing an edge. The simplest example is the Möbius strip; the Klein bottle can be made by gluing two Möbius strips together edge to edge. As a consequence of the Jordan–Brouwer separation theorem, a closed surface embedded in three-dimensional space must be two-sided; a closed one-sided surface such as the Klein bottle therefore cannot be embedded in three-dimensional space, and any 3D representation of it must cross through itself. The familiar "bottle" picture, in which a tube bends around and passes through its own wall, is one such surface. The Ida surface is a different one, which arises naturally from the geometry of the Roman surface and Boy's surface rather than from the bottle depiction.

Self-crossing in a surface can happen in two distinct ways. Along a double curve, two sheets of the surface pass cleanly through one another, the way two intersecting soap films would; each sheet on its own remains perfectly smooth, and in the four-dimensional original the two sheets simply miss each other. But a double curve can also come to a dead end on the surface, at a point where the two crossing sheets are squeezed together into one. Such an end point is called a pinch point (or Whitney umbrella point), and the surface is genuinely singular there: it is not smooth, no matter how it is viewed. A surface whose only self-crossings are clean double curves, with no pinch points, is an immersion.

Steiner's Roman surface, a nineteenth-century representation of the real projective plane (the other classical closed one-sided surface), has six pinch points. In 1901 Werner Boy showed that the projective plane could be immersed in 3-space with no pinch points at all, producing Boy's surface. Much later, François Apéry, a student of Bernard Morin, found explicit parametrizations and an algebraic equation for Boy's surface, together with a deformation, the Romboy homotopy, that carries the Roman surface to Boy's surface by cancelling its pinch points in pairs. The Ida surface is obtained by applying the same pinch point cancellation to a Klein bottle analogue of the Roman surface, the Etruscan Venus.

== Ovalesque surfaces ==
The surfaces in this family are examples of what Francis calls ovalesques: surfaces swept out by the prescribed motion of a plane oval, such as an ellipse, through space. The notion generalizes that of a ruled surface, which is swept out by a moving straight line.

The starting point is Apéry's generation of the Roman surface as a one-parameter family of ellipses, all tangent to a horizontal plane at a single point, the south pole of the surface. The construction depends on two fixed positive constants, $r_1$ and $r_2$, which are easiest to understand by picturing two points circling in space. One point travels counterclockwise around a horizontal circle of radius $r_1$ held at constant height $r_2$ above the south pole; the other travels clockwise around a unit circle in the base plane itself, turning through half the angle, so that as the first point sweeps an angle $2\theta$ the second sweeps $\theta$. For each value of an equatorial angle $\theta$, the generating ellipse is specified by a pair of conjugate semi-axes drawn from the south pole to these two moving points: an altitudinal axis

$$A(\theta) = \begin{pmatrix} r_1 \cos 2\theta \\ r_1 \sin 2\theta \\ r_2 \end{pmatrix}$$

which reaches up to the point on the raised circle, leaning away from the vertical by an amount governed by the ratio $r_1/r_2$, and a horizontal basal axis

$$B(\theta) = \begin{pmatrix} \cos\theta \\ -\sin\theta \\ 0 \end{pmatrix}$$

which points to the point on the unit base circle. Thus $r_1$ sets how far the upper axis sways from the vertical, and $r_2$ sets the height of the ellipses (and so of the whole surface). These two vectors are the columns of a $3\times 2$ matrix $L(\theta) = \langle A(\theta), B(\theta)\rangle$, regarded as a linear map of a plane into space. A point of the surface is then the image under $L(\theta)$ of a point on a plane curve with Cartesian coordinates $(\rho\cos\tau, \rho\sin\tau)$:

$$P(\theta, \tau) = \rho(\theta,\tau)\,\bigl[\,A(\theta)\cos\tau + B(\theta)\sin\tau\,\bigr].$$

The shape of the generating oval is controlled entirely by the scalar function $\rho(\theta, \tau)$, and the whole family $F(\ell, b)$ is obtained by varying $\rho$ while the axes $A$ and $B$ are kept fixed.

== The family F(ℓ, b) ==
Two independent deformations, each acting on the generating curve in its own plane, are combined in a single polar equation:

$$\rho(\theta,\tau) = \frac{(1-\ell)\cos\tau + \ell}{\,1 - \dfrac{b}{\sqrt{2}}\sin 3\theta \, \sin 2\tau\,}.$$

The limaçon homotopy is governed by the numerator and the parameter $\ell$. When $\ell = 0$ the generating curve is the circle $\rho = \cos\tau$, which passes through the origin and is traced twice as $\tau$ runs through a full turn; this double covering is what makes the swept surface a projective plane. As $\ell$ increases, the curve uncurls through the limaçons of Pascal $\rho = (1-\ell)\cos\tau + \ell$: it is Pascal's trisectrix at $\ell = 1/3$, a cardioid at $\ell = 1/2$, and the unit circle, traced once, at $\ell = 1$. Replacing the doubly covered circle by a simple closed oval replaces the projective plane by a Klein bottle.

The Romboy homotopy is governed by the denominator and the parameter $b$. Following Apéry, the denominator $1 - (b/\sqrt 2)\sin 3\theta \sin 2\tau$ magnifies and tilts each generating oval within its own plane. As $b$ increases, the pinch points of the surface cancel in adjacent pairs, all of them vanishing at $b = 1/\sqrt 3$; past this value the surface is an immersion. Applied to the Roman surface this is exactly Apéry's deformation onto Boy's surface, which is why Francis named it the Romboy homotopy.

The four corners of the parameter square are occupied by four named surfaces:

Surface	$(\ell, b)$	Topology	Pinch points
Roman surface	$F(0, 0)$	projective plane	6
Boy's surface	$F(0, 1)$	projective plane	0 (immersed)
Etruscan Venus	$F(1, 0)$	Klein bottle	12
Ida surface	$F(1, 1)$	Klein bottle	0 (immersed)

The Etruscan Venus is the uncurled Roman surface. It is a singular Klein bottle, equivalent to the connected sum of two Roman surfaces joined at their south poles, and it inherits a doubled set of twelve pinch points. Applying the Romboy homotopy to the Venus cancels all twelve, and the immersed Klein bottle that emerges at $F(1,1)$ is the Ida surface. The full sequence of the deformation — Etruscan Venus to Roman surface to Boy's surface to Ida and back to the Venus — was animated in the videotape Metamorphosis: Shadows from Higher Dimensions and is reproduced as a sequence of frames in Peterson's Islands of Truth.

== Parametrization ==
Putting the pieces together, the general member $F(\ell, b)$ of the family is the image of the map

$$P(\theta, \tau) = \frac{(1-\ell)\cos\tau + \ell}{\,1 - \dfrac{b}{\sqrt{2}}\sin 3\theta\,\sin 2\tau\,} \begin{pmatrix} r_1 \cos 2\theta & \cos\theta \\ r_1 \sin 2\theta & -\sin\theta \\ r_2 & 0 \end{pmatrix} \begin{pmatrix} \cos\tau \\ \sin\tau \end{pmatrix},$$

in which the columns of the matrix are the axes $A(\theta)$ and $B(\theta)$, and the scalar fraction in front is $\rho(\theta, \tau)$. The Ida surface is $F(1, 1)$. Substituting $\ell = 1$ collapses the limaçon numerator $(1-\ell)\cos\tau + \ell$ to the constant $1$, and substituting $b = 1$ sets the coefficient of $\sin 3\theta\,\sin 2\tau$ in the denominator to $1/\sqrt{2}$, leaving

$$P(\theta, \tau) = \frac{1}{\,1 - \dfrac{1}{\sqrt{2}}\sin 3\theta\,\sin 2\tau\,} \begin{pmatrix} r_1 \cos 2\theta & \cos\theta \\ r_1 \sin 2\theta & -\sin\theta \\ r_2 & 0 \end{pmatrix} \begin{pmatrix} \cos\tau \\ \sin\tau \end{pmatrix}.$$

A common choice of proportions is $r_1 = \tfrac12$ and $r_2 = 1$, giving a waist-to-height ratio $r_1/r_2 = \tfrac12$, the value originally used for the Etruscan Venus.

The map satisfies the identity

$$P(\theta + \pi,\; 2\pi - \tau) = P(\theta, \tau),$$

which is precisely the gluing rule of a Klein bottle: the parameter torus double-covers the image, with the covering transformation reversing the direction of $\tau$. Consequently the whole surface is traced exactly once on the fundamental domain

$$0 \le \theta \le 2\pi, \qquad 0 \le \tau \le \pi.$$

The remaining self-intersections of the image are double curves of the immersion, not artifacts of the parametrization.

== Shading the surface ==
Rendering the Ida surface poses a problem that ordinary shading models do not handle well, because the surface is one-sided and so has no consistent notion of an "outer" and an "inner" face. A standard shading model sets a polygon's brightness from the dot product of its surface normal with the direction to the light, which presumes that the normals can be oriented consistently across the whole surface. On a one-sided surface they cannot: where the surface closes back on itself, adjacent polygon normals point in nearly opposite directions. Duplicating every polygon with reversed vertex order, a common remedy for showing both faces of a two-sided object, doubles the amount of data and, when the shading is smoothed, leaves a visible seam along the join, while averaging two opposing normals at a shared vertex cancels them to a near-zero vector that carries no usable direction.

The rendering algorithm devised by Ray Idaszak for this project removes the difficulty with a single change: it uses the absolute value of the dot product of the normal and the light direction (that is, a modification of Lambert shading, which is based on Lambert's cosine law) in place of the signed value. The algorithm is concomitant with the Ida surface's discovery, since it is what made the surface visible: rendered with it, the immersed Klein bottle at $F(1,1)$ could be seen on the computer screen, and because Idaszak was the first to see it, Francis declared the surface the namesake of Idaszak. Accounts of the surface, from the period of its discovery onward, describe the Ida surface mathematics together with Idaszak's rendering algorithm.

To see why the method works, recall how the normal is obtained. The normal to a polygon can be found from the plane in which the polygon lies, taking the first three coefficients of the plane equation; for three non-collinear vertices $(x_1, y_1, z_1)$, $(x_2, y_2, z_2)$ and $(x_3, y_3, z_3)$, the normal $(A, B, C)$ solves the homogeneous system

$$\begin{aligned} Ax_1 + By_1 + Cz_1 &= -D, \\ Ax_2 + By_2 + Cz_2 &= -D, \\ Ax_3 + By_3 + Cz_3 &= -D, \end{aligned}$$

which gives

$$\begin{aligned} A &= y_1(z_2-z_3) + y_2(z_3-z_1) + y_3(z_1-z_2), \\ B &= x_1(z_3-z_2) + x_2(z_1-z_3) + x_3(z_2-z_1), \\ C &= x_1(y_2-y_3) + x_2(y_3-y_1) + x_3(y_1-y_2). \end{aligned}$$

Reversing the order of the vertices — swapping $x_1$ with $x_3$, $y_1$ with $y_3$, and $z_1$ with $z_3$ — negates each coefficient, since

$$\begin{aligned} A' &= y_3(z_2-z_1) + y_2(z_1-z_3) + y_1(z_3-z_2) \\ &= -\bigl[\,y_1(z_2-z_3) + y_2(z_3-z_1) + y_3(z_1-z_2)\,\bigr] = -A, \end{aligned}$$

and likewise $B' = -B$ and $C' = -C$. So the two possible vertex orderings give opposite normals, $N_1 = (A, B, C)$ and $N_2 = (-A, -B, -C)$; against a light direction $L = (L_x, L_y, L_z)$ they yield

$$\begin{aligned} N_1 \cdot L &= AL_x + BL_y + CL_z, \\ N_2 \cdot L &= -(AL_x + BL_y + CL_z), \end{aligned}$$

equal in magnitude and opposite in sign. The ordering of a polygon's vertices therefore affects only the sign of $N \cdot L$, never its magnitude, and taking the absolute value $|N \cdot L|$ makes the shading independent of that ordering. Each polygon is then lit as though it faced the light, and the surface can be shaded with no consistent global choice of side. For flat shading nothing more than this absolute value is needed.

Smooth shading takes one further step. A normal is first computed at each vertex, by making the normals of the polygons meeting there mutually consistent — reversing the ordering of any polygon whose shared edge runs the same way as its neighbour's — and then averaging the non-parallel normals. The vertex normal $N$ is turned toward the light according to the sign of $N \cdot L$: where $N \cdot L < 0$ the normal points away from the light and is reversed. Because this orientation depends on the light direction, the vertex normals must be recomputed whenever the object or the light moves, which is the method's chief cost.

The approach has several offsetting advantages. Polygons may be given in arbitrary, inconsistent vertex order and need be defined only once, which keeps the model small and shortens rendering time, and the usual polygon-visibility test becomes unnecessary. Its characteristic side effect is that the surface appears lit as though by two opposed light sources facing each other across the object, so that regions turned away from a single light are still revealed rather than left in shadow — fitting for a closed surface whose two local sides are equally part of the figure. The same technique renders any polygonal model with inconsistent vertex ordering, not only one-sided surfaces.

== Publications and media coverage ==
- The IEEE Computer magazine (the flagship magazine of the IEEE Computer Society), vol. 22, no. 8 (August 1989), featured a rendering of the Ida surface, titled "Romboy Homotopy," on its cover, with attribution to Ray Idaszak, Donna Cox, and George Francis of the National Center for Supercomputing Applications; the same image had been included earlier in the ACM SIGGRAPH '88 Technical Slide Show.
- The Ida surface appears on the cover of the book Islands of Truth: A Mathematical Mystery Cruise by Ivars Peterson (W. H. Freeman, 1990), where it is reproduced inside as Color Plate 3, titled "Ida Thoughts." The book's "Sources and Illustrations" section credits the image to Donna Cox, George Francis, and Ray Idaszak of the National Center for Supercomputing Applications.
- The narrated videotape The Etruscan Venus by George Francis, Donna Cox and Ray Idaszak was distributed by the Association for Computing Machinery in SIGGRAPH Video Review no. 49 (1989).
- The surface has an entry, "Ida Surface", in Eric Weisstein's MathWorld.
- Since 2020 the deformation among the Etruscan Venus, the Roman surface, Boy's surface and the Ida surface has been implemented as the etruscanvenus display mode of the free-software screensaver collection XScreenSaver, whose documentation credits the deformation to George K. Francis.

== See also ==
- Roman surface
- Boy's surface
- Klein bottle
- Möbius strip
- Limaçon
- Bernard Morin
- Jordan curve theorem § Generalisations
