= Advanced Visualization Lab =

The Advanced Visualization Lab (AVL) is a team at the National Center for Supercomputing Applications at the University of Illinois at Urbana-Champaign. The AVL specializes in creating cinematic scientific visualizations of large, three-dimensional, time-evolving data. The AVL has contributed to a number of scientific documentaries including the IMAX films "A Beautiful Planet". and "Hubble 3D", a number of fulldome films, and television documentaries.

== History ==
Cinematic visualization work at the NCSA started in 1994 under University of Illinois Art + Design Professor Donna Cox, and was formalized under the "Advanced Visualization Lab" name in 2006. Cox coined the term "Renaissance Team" to describe the combination of artists, technologists, and scientists that it takes to create cinematic scientific visualizations. Unlike many visualization teams who use visualization software to create their imagery, the AVL relies primarily on visual effects tools and techniques to achieve a cinematic look

As of 2020, the core AVL team members are Donna Cox (director), Robert Patterson (designer), Stuart Levy (senior programmer), Kalina Borkiewicz (senior programmer), AJ Christensen (programmer/designer), and Jeff Carpenter (multimedia specialist).
