= Elliptic geometry =

Non-Euclidean geometry

Elliptic geometry is an example of a geometry in which Euclid's parallel postulate does not hold. Instead, as in spherical geometry, there are no parallel lines since any two lines must intersect. However, unlike in spherical geometry, two lines are usually assumed to intersect at a single point (rather than two). Because of this, the elliptic geometry described in this article is sometimes referred to as single elliptic geometry whereas spherical geometry is sometimes referred to as double elliptic geometry.

The appearance of work on this geometry in the nineteenth century stimulated the development of non-Euclidean geometry generally, including hyperbolic geometry.

Elliptic geometry has a variety of properties that differ from those of classical Euclidean plane geometry. For example, the sum of the interior angles of any triangle is always greater than 180°.

== Definitions ==
Elliptic geometry may be derived from spherical geometry by identifying antipodal points of the sphere to a single elliptic point. The elliptic lines correspond to great circles reduced by the identification of antipodal points. As any two great circles intersect, there are no parallel lines in elliptic geometry.

In elliptic geometry, two lines perpendicular to a given line must intersect. In fact, all perpendiculars to a given line intersect at a single point called the absolute pole of that line.

Every point corresponds to an absolute polar line of which it is the absolute pole. Any point on this polar line forms an absolute conjugate pair with the pole. Such a pair of points is orthogonal, and the distance between them is a quadrant.

The distance between a pair of points is proportional to the angle between their absolute polars.

As explained by H. S. M. Coxeter:

The name "elliptic" is possibly misleading. It does not imply any direct connection with the curve called an ellipse, but only a rather far-fetched analogy. A central conic is called an ellipse or a hyperbola according as it has no asymptote or two asymptotes. Analogously, a non-Euclidean plane is said to be elliptic or hyperbolic according as each of its lines contains no point at infinity or two points at infinity.

== Two dimensions ==
=== Elliptic plane ===
The elliptic plane is the real projective plane provided with a metric. Kepler and Desargues used the gnomonic projection to relate a plane σ to points on a hemisphere tangent to it. With O the center of the hemisphere, a point P in σ determines a line OP intersecting the hemisphere, and any line L ⊂ σ determines a plane OL which intersects the hemisphere in half of a great circle. The hemisphere is bounded by a plane through O and parallel to σ. No ordinary line of σ corresponds to this plane; instead a line at infinity is appended to σ. As any line in this extension of σ corresponds to a plane through O, and since any pair of such planes intersects in a line through O, one can conclude that any pair of lines in the extension intersect: the point of intersection lies where the plane intersection meets σ or the line at infinity. Thus the axiom of projective geometry, requiring all pairs of lines in a plane to intersect, is confirmed.

Given P and Q in σ, the elliptic distance between them is the measure of the angle POQ, usually taken in radians. Arthur Cayley initiated the study of elliptic geometry when he wrote "On the definition of distance". This venture into abstraction in geometry was followed by Felix Klein and Bernhard Riemann leading to non-Euclidean geometry and Riemannian geometry.

=== Comparison with Euclidean geometry ===
Comparison of elliptic, Euclidean and hyperbolic geometries in two dimensions

In Euclidean geometry, a figure can be scaled up or scaled down indefinitely, and the resulting figures are similar, i.e., they have the same angles and the same internal proportions. In elliptic geometry, this is not the case. For example, in the spherical model we can see that the distance between any two points must be strictly less than half the circumference of the sphere (because antipodal points are identified). A line segment therefore cannot be scaled up indefinitely.

A great deal of Euclidean geometry carries over directly to elliptic geometry. For example, the first and fourth of Euclid's postulates, that there is a unique line between any two points and that all right angles are equal, hold in elliptic geometry. Postulate 3, that one can construct a circle with any given center and radius, fails if "any radius" is taken to mean "any real number", but holds if it is taken to mean "the length of any given line segment". Therefore any result in Euclidean geometry that follows from these three postulates will hold in elliptic geometry, such as proposition 1 from book I of the Elements, which states that given any line segment, an equilateral triangle can be constructed with the segment as its base.

Elliptic geometry is also like Euclidean geometry in that space is continuous, homogeneous, isotropic, and without boundaries. Isotropy is guaranteed by the fourth postulate, that all right angles are equal. For an example of homogeneity, note that Euclid's proposition I.1 implies that the same equilateral triangle can be constructed at any location, not just in locations that are special in some way. The lack of boundaries follows from the second postulate, extensibility of a line segment.

One way in which elliptic geometry differs from Euclidean geometry is that the sum of the interior angles of a triangle is greater than 180 degrees. In the spherical model, for example, a triangle can be constructed with vertices at the locations where the three positive Cartesian coordinate axes intersect the sphere, and all three of its internal angles are 90 degrees, summing to 270 degrees. For sufficiently small triangles, the excess over 180 degrees can be made arbitrarily small.

The Pythagorean theorem fails in elliptic geometry. In the 90°–90°–90° triangle described above, all three sides have the same length, and consequently do not satisfy $a^2+b^2=c^2$. The Pythagorean result is recovered in the limit of small triangles.

The ratio of a circle's circumference to its area is smaller than in Euclidean geometry. In general, area and volume do not scale as the second and third powers of linear dimensions.

== Elliptic space (the 3D case) ==
Note: This section uses the term "elliptic space" to refer specifically to 3-dimensional elliptic geometry. This is in contrast to the previous section, which was about 2-dimensional elliptic geometry. The quaternions are used to elucidate this space.

Elliptic space can be constructed in a way similar to the construction of three-dimensional vector space: with equivalence classes. One uses directed arcs on great circles of the sphere. As directed line segments are equipollent when they are parallel, of the same length, and similarly oriented, so directed arcs found on great circles are equipollent when they are of the same length, orientation, and great circle. These relations of equipollence produce 3D vector space and elliptic space, respectively.

Access to elliptic space structure is provided through the vector algebra of William Rowan Hamilton: he envisioned a sphere as a domain of square roots of minus one. Then Euler's formula $\exp(\theta r) = \cos \theta + r \sin \theta$ (where r is on the sphere) represents the great circle in the plane containing 1 and r. Opposite points r and −r correspond to oppositely directed circles. An arc between θ and φ is equipollent with one between 0 and φ − θ. In elliptic space, arc length is less than π, so arcs may be parametrized with θ in [0, π) or (−π/2, π/2].

For $z = \exp(\theta r), \ z^* = \exp(-\theta r) \implies z z^* = 1 .$ It is said that the modulus or norm of z is one (Hamilton called it the tensor of z). But since r ranges over a sphere in 3-space, exp(θ r) ranges over a sphere in 4-space, now called the 3-sphere, as its surface has three dimensions. Hamilton called his algebra quaternions and it quickly became a useful and celebrated tool of mathematics. Its space of four dimensions is evolved in polar co-ordinates $t \exp(\theta r),$ with t in the positive real numbers.

When doing trigonometry on Earth or the celestial sphere, the sides of the triangles are great circle arcs. The first success of quaternions was a rendering of spherical trigonometry to algebra. Hamilton called a quaternion of norm one a versor, and these are the points of elliptic space.

With r fixed, the versors

$$e^{ar}, \quad 0 \le a < \pi$$

form an elliptic line. The distance from $e^{ar}$ to 1 is a. For an arbitrary versor u, the distance will be that θ for which cos θ = (u + u^{∗})/2 since this is the formula for the scalar part of any quaternion.

An elliptic motion is described by the quaternion mapping

$q \mapsto u q v,$ where u and v are fixed versors.

Distances between points are the same as between image points of an elliptic motion. In the case that u and v are quaternion conjugates of one another, the motion is a spatial rotation, and their vector part is the axis of rotation. In the case u = 1 the elliptic motion is called a right Clifford translation, or a parataxy. The case v = 1 corresponds to left Clifford translation.

Elliptic lines through versor u may be of the form

$\lbrace u e^{ar} : 0 \le a < \pi \rbrace$ or $\lbrace e^{ar}u : 0 \le a < \pi \rbrace$ for a fixed r.

They are the right and left Clifford translations of u along an elliptic line through 1. The elliptic space is formed from S^{3} by identifying antipodal points.

Elliptic space has special structures called Clifford parallels and Clifford surfaces.

The versor points of elliptic space are mapped by the Cayley transform to $\mathbb{R}^3$ for an alternative representation of the space.

== Higher-dimensional spaces ==
=== Hyperspherical model ===
The hyperspherical model is the generalization of the spherical model to higher dimensions. The points of n-dimensional elliptic space are the pairs of unit vectors (x, −x) in R^{n+1}, that is, pairs of antipodal points on the surface of the unit ball in (n + 1)-dimensional space (the n-dimensional hypersphere). Lines in this model are great circles, i.e., intersections of the hypersphere with flat hypersurfaces of dimension n passing through the origin.

=== Projective elliptic geometry ===
In the projective model of elliptic geometry, the points of n-dimensional real projective space are used as points of the model. This models an abstract elliptic geometry that is also known as projective geometry.

The points of n-dimensional projective space can be identified with lines through the origin in (n + 1)-dimensional space, and can be represented non-uniquely by nonzero vectors in R^{n+1}, with the understanding that u and λu, for any non-zero scalar λ, represent the same point. Distance is defined using the metric

$$d(u, v) = \arccos \left(\frac{|u \cdot v|}{\|u\|\  \|v\|}\right);$$

that is, the distance between two points is the angle between their corresponding lines in R^{n+1}. The distance formula is homogeneous in each variable, with d(λu, μv) = d(u, v) if λ and μ are non-zero scalars, so it does define a distance on the points of projective space.

A notable property of the projective elliptic geometry is that for even dimensions, such as the plane, the geometry is non-orientable. It erases the distinction between clockwise and counterclockwise rotation by identifying them.

=== Stereographic model ===
A model representing the same space as the hyperspherical model can be obtained by means of stereographic projection. Let E^{n} represent R^{n} ∪ {∞}, that is, n-dimensional real space extended by a single point at infinity. We may define a metric, the chordal metric, on E^{n} by

$$\delta(u, v)=\frac{2 \|u-v\|}{\sqrt{(1+\|u\|^2)(1+\|v\|^2)}}$$

where u and v are any two vectors in R^{n} and $\|\cdot\|$ is the usual Euclidean norm. We also define

$$\delta(u, \infty)=\delta(\infty, u) = \frac{2}{\sqrt{1+\|u\|^2}}.$$

The result is a metric space on E^{n}, which represents the distance along a chord of the corresponding points on the hyperspherical model, to which it maps bijectively by stereographic projection. We obtain a model of spherical geometry if we use the metric

$$d(u, v) = 2 \arcsin\left(\frac{\delta(u,v)}{2}\right).$$

Elliptic geometry is obtained from this by identifying the antipodal points u and −u / ‖u‖^{2}, and taking the distance from v to this pair to be the minimum of the distances from v to each of these two points.

== Self-consistency ==
Because spherical elliptic geometry can be modeled as, for example, a spherical subspace of a Euclidean space, it follows that if Euclidean geometry is self-consistent, so is spherical elliptic geometry. Therefore it is not possible to prove the parallel postulate based on the other four postulates of Euclidean geometry.

Tarski proved that elementary Euclidean geometry is complete: there is an algorithm which, for every proposition, can show it to be either true or false. (This does not violate Gödel's theorem, because Euclidean geometry cannot describe a sufficient amount of arithmetic for the theorem to apply.) It therefore follows that elementary elliptic geometry is also self-consistent and complete.

== See also ==
- Elliptic tiling
- Spherical tiling
