= Non-orientable wormhole =

Type of wormhole

The space that this male fiddler crab (a chiral object) lives in, a Möbius strip, is non-orientable. Note that the fiddler crab flips to being its own mirror image with every complete circulation

In wormhole theory, a non-orientable wormhole is a wormhole connection that appears to reverse the chirality of anything passed through it. It is related to the "twisted" connections normally used to construct a Möbius strip or Klein bottle.

In topology, this sort of connection is referred to as an Alice handle.

== Theory ==
=== "Normal" wormhole connection ===
Matt Visser has described a way of visualising wormhole geometry:

1. Take a "normal" region of space
2. "Surgically remove" spherical volumes from two regions ("spacetime surgery")
3. Associate the two spherical bleeding edges, so that a line attempting to enter one "missing" spherical volume encounters one bounding surface and then continues outward from the other.

Although these instructions seem straightforward, there are two topologically distinct ways the two surfaces can be mapped to one another. If we draw a map of the Earth's surface onto one wormhole mouth, how does this map appear at the second mouth?

For a "conventional" wormhole, the network of points will be seen at the second surface to be inverted, as if one surface was the mirror image of the other – countries will appear back-to-front, as will any text written on the map. This is as it should be, because in a sense, the second mouth is showing us the view of the same map seen "from the other side".

=== "Reversed" wormhole connection ===
The alternative way of connecting the surfaces makes the "connection map" appear the same at both mouths.

This configuration reverses the "handedness" or "chirality" of any objects passing through. If a spaceship pilot writes the word "IOTA" on the inside of their forward window, then, as the ship's nose passes through the wormhole and the ship's window intersects the surface, an observer at the other mouth looking in through the glass should see the same word, "IOTA", written on the window of the emerging spaceship. Once the spaceship has passed through, the curious onlooker may peek inside the spaceship cockpit and find that what is written on the inside of the glass is actually "ATOI" – the handedness of the writing (and of every other part of the spaceship, including the pilot) has been inverted by its passage through the wormhole.

==== Consequences ====
As well as turning left-handed screwthreads into right-handed screwthreads, and left-handed gloves into right-handed gloves, reversing the chirality of an object is also usually associated with the idea of reversing the sign of electromagnetic charge – if a positron can be considered as a time-reversed electron, it can also be considered as an electron aging conventionally, but with one spatial dimension reversed. The existence of a traversable nonorientable wormhole would seem to allow the conversion of matter to antimatter, and vice versa.

A universe that includes one of these "non-orientable" connections does not allow a global definition of whether a particle is "really" matter or antimatter, and this sort of universe, with no global definition of charge is referred to in research papers as an "Alice universe."

== Alice universe ==
In theoretical physics, an Alice universe is a hypothetical universe with no global definition of charge. What a Klein bottle is to a closed two-dimensional surface, an Alice universe is to a closed three-dimensional volume. The name is a reference to the main character in Lewis Carroll's 1871 children's book Through the Looking-Glass.

An Alice universe can be considered to allow at least two topologically distinct routes between any two points, and if one connection (or "handle") is declared to be a "conventional" spatial connection, at least one other must be deemed to be a non-orientable wormhole connection.

Once these two connections are made, we can no longer define whether a given particle is matter or antimatter. A particle might appear as an electron when viewed along one route, and as a positron when viewed along the other. In another nod to Lewis Carroll, charge with magnitude but no persistently identifiable polarity is referred to in the literature as Cheshire charge, after Carroll's Cheshire Cat, whose body would fade in and out, and whose only persistent property was its smile. If we define a reference charge as nominally positive and bring it alongside our "undefined charge" particle, the two particles may attract if brought together along one route, and repel if brought together along another – the Alice universe loses the ability to distinguish between positive and negative charges, except locally. For this reason, CP violation is impossible in an Alice universe.

As with a Möbius strip, once the two distinct connections have been made, we can no longer identify which connection is "normal" and which is "reversed" – the lack of a global definition for charge becomes a feature of the global geometry. This behaviour is analogous to the way that a small piece of a Möbius strip allows a local distinction between two sides of a piece of paper, but the distinction disappears when the strip is considered globally.

== See also ==
- Orientability
- Mirror life
