= Hsiang–Lawson's conjecture =

Theorem that the Clifford torus is the only minimally embedded torus in the 3-sphere

In differential geometry, Lawson's conjecture states that the Clifford torus is the only minimally embedded torus in the 3-sphere S^{3}. The conjecture was featured by the Australian Mathematical Society Gazette as part of the Millennium Problems series.

In March 2012, Simon Brendle gave a proof of this conjecture, based on maximum principle techniques.
