= Klein bottle =

Non-orientable mathematical surface

A two-dimensional representation of the Klein bottle immersed in three-dimensional space

In mathematics, the Klein bottle (/ˈklaɪn/) is an example of a surface with no distinct inside or outside. In other words, it is a one-sided surface which, if traveled upon, could be followed back to the point of origin while flipping the traveler upside down. More formally, it is an example of a non-orientable surface, a two-dimensional manifold on which one cannot define a consistent direction perpendicular to the surface (normal vector) that varies continuously over the whole shape. It is named for Felix Klein, who first described it in 1882.

The Klein bottle is related to other non-orientable surfaces like the Möbius strip, which also has only one side but does have a boundary. In contrast, the Klein bottle is boundaryless, like a sphere or torus, though it cannot be embedded in ordinary three-dimensional space without intersecting itself.

== Construction ==
The following square is a fundamental polygon of the Klein bottle. The idea is to 'glue' together the corresponding red and blue edges with the arrows matching, as in the diagrams below. Note that this is an "abstract" gluing, in the sense that trying to realize this in three dimensions results in a self-intersecting Klein bottle.

To construct the Klein bottle, glue the red arrows of the square together (left and right sides), resulting in a cylinder. To glue the ends of the cylinder together so that the arrows on the circles match, one would pass one end through the side of the cylinder. This creates a curve of self-intersection; this is thus an immersion of the Klein bottle in the three-dimensional space.

This immersion is useful for visualizing many properties of the Klein bottle. For example, the Klein bottle has no boundary, where the surface stops abruptly, and it is non-orientable, as reflected in the one-sidedness of the immersion.

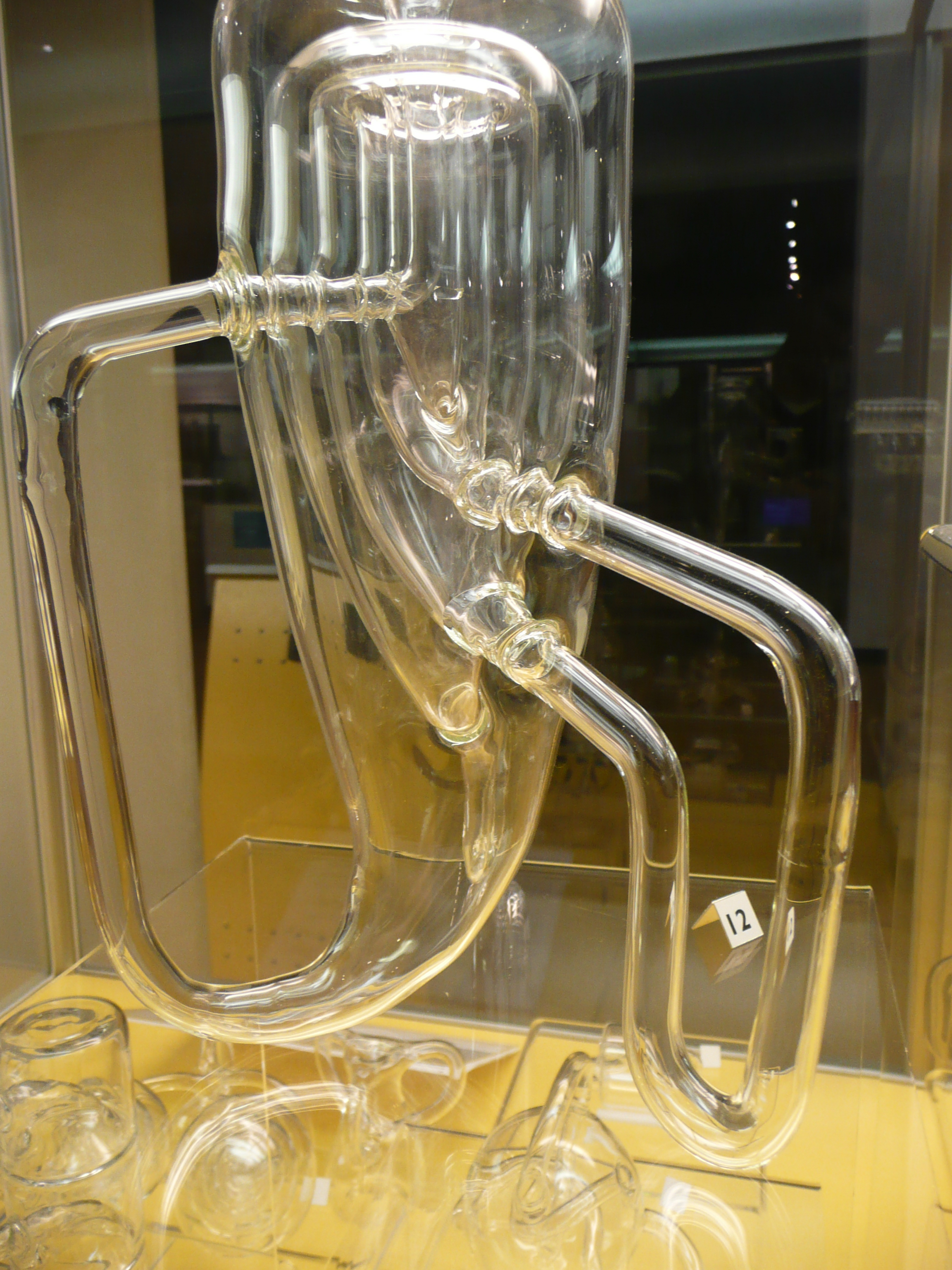
Immersed Klein bottles in the Science Museum in London

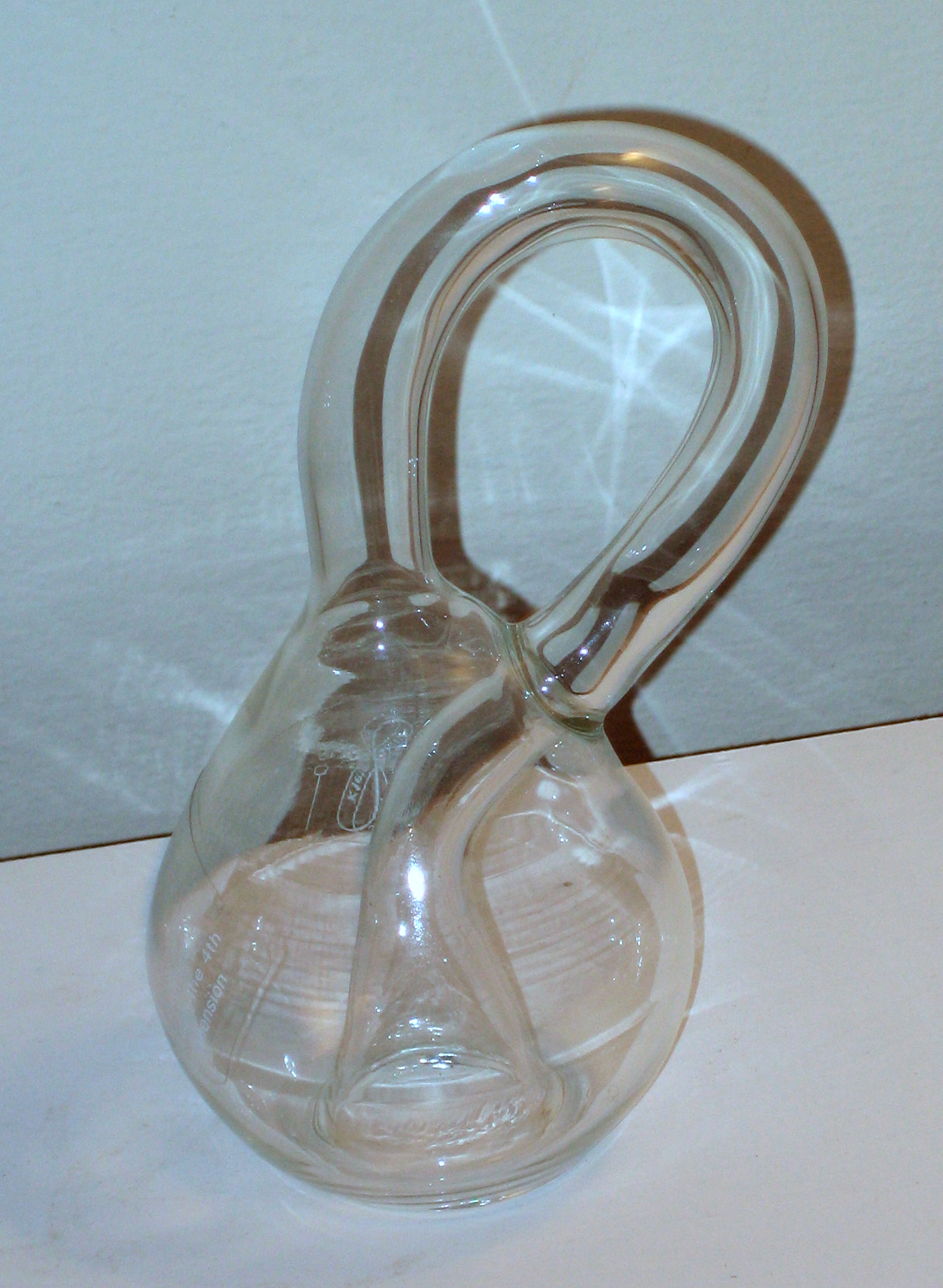
A hand-blown Klein bottle

The common physical model of a Klein bottle is a similar construction. The Science Museum in London has a collection of hand-blown glass Klein bottles on display, exhibiting many variations on this topological theme. The bottles were made for the museum by Alan Bennett in 1995.

The Klein bottle, proper, does not self-intersect. Nonetheless, there is a way to visualize the Klein bottle as being contained in four dimensions. By adding a fourth dimension to the three-dimensional space, the self-intersection can be eliminated. Gently push a piece of the tube containing the intersection along the fourth dimension, out of the original three-dimensional space. A useful analogy is to consider a self-intersecting curve on the plane; self-intersections can be eliminated by lifting one strand off the plane.

Time evolution of a Klein figure in xyzt-space

Suppose for clarification that we adopt time as that fourth dimension. Consider how the figure could be constructed in xyzt-space. The accompanying illustration ("Time evolution...") shows one useful evolution of the figure. At t = 0 the wall sprouts from a bud somewhere near the "intersection" point. After the figure has grown for a while, the earliest section of the wall begins to recede, disappearing like the Cheshire Cat but leaving its ever-expanding smile behind. By the time the growth front gets to where the bud had been, there is nothing there to intersect and the growth completes without piercing existing structure. The 4-figure as defined cannot exist in 3-space but is easily understood in 4-space.

More formally, the Klein bottle is the quotient space described as the square [0,1] × [0,1] with sides identified by the relations (0, y) ~ (1, y) for 0 ≤ y ≤ 1 and (x, 0) ~ (1 − x, 1) for 0 ≤ x ≤ 1.

== Properties ==
Like the Möbius strip, the Klein bottle is a two-dimensional manifold which is not orientable. Unlike the Möbius strip, it is a closed manifold, meaning it is a compact manifold without boundary. While the Möbius strip can be embedded in three-dimensional Euclidean space R^{3}, the Klein bottle cannot. It can be embedded in R^{4}, however.

Continuing this sequence, for example creating a 3-manifold which cannot be embedded in R^{4} but can be in R^{5}, is possible; in this case, connecting two ends of a spherinder to each other in the same manner as the two ends of a cylinder for a Klein bottle, creates a figure, referred to as a "spherinder Klein bottle", that cannot fully be embedded in R^{4}.

The Klein bottle can be seen as a fiber bundle over the circle S^{1}, with fibre S^{1}, as follows: one takes the square (modulo the edge identifying equivalence relation) from above to be E, the total space, while the base space B is given by the unit interval in y, modulo 1~0. The projection π:E→B is then given by π([x, y]) = [y].

The Klein bottle can be constructed (in a four dimensional space, because in three dimensional space it cannot be done without allowing the surface to intersect itself) by joining the edges of two Möbius strips, as described in the following limerick by Leo Moser:

A mathematician named Klein
Thought the Möbius band was divine.
Said he: "If you glue
The edges of two,
You'll get a weird bottle like mine."

The initial construction of the Klein bottle by identifying opposite edges of a square shows that the Klein bottle can be given a CW complex structure with one 0-cell P, two 1-cells C_{1}, C_{2} and one 2-cell D. Its Euler characteristic is therefore 1 − 2 + 1 = 0. The boundary homomorphism is given by ∂D = 2C_{1} and ∂C_{1} = ∂C_{2} = 0, yielding the homology groups of the Klein bottle K to be H_{0}(K, Z) = Z, H_{1}(K, Z) = Z×(Z/2Z) and H_{n}(K, Z) = 0 for n > 1.

There is a 2-1 covering map from the torus to the Klein bottle, because two copies of the fundamental region of the Klein bottle, one being placed next to the mirror image of the other, yield a fundamental region of the torus. The universal cover of both the torus and the Klein bottle is the plane R^{2}.

The fundamental group of the Klein bottle can be determined as the group of deck transformations of the universal cover and has the presentation ⟨a, b | ab = b^{−1}a⟩. It follows that it is isomorphic to $\mathbb{Z} \rtimes \mathbb{Z}$, the only nontrivial semidirect product of the additive group of integers $\mathbb{Z}$ with itself.

A 6-colored Klein bottle, the only exception to the Heawood conjecture

Six colors suffice to color any map on the surface of a Klein bottle; this is the only exception to the Heawood conjecture, a generalization of the four color theorem, which would require seven.

A Klein bottle is homeomorphic to the connected sum of two projective planes. It is also homeomorphic to a sphere plus two cross-caps.

When embedded in Euclidean space, the Klein bottle is one-sided. However, there are other topological 3-spaces, and in some of the non-orientable examples a Klein bottle can be embedded such that it is two-sided, though due to the nature of the space it remains non-orientable.

== Dissection ==
Dissecting the Klein bottle results in two Möbius strips.

Dissecting a Klein bottle into halves along its plane of symmetry results in two mirror image Möbius strips, i.e. one with a left-handed half-twist and the other with a right-handed half-twist (one of these is pictured on the right). Remember that the intersection pictured is not really there.

== Simple-closed curves ==
One description of the types of simple-closed curves that may appear on the surface of the Klein bottle is given by the use of the first homology group of the Klein bottle calculated with integer coefficients. This group is isomorphic to Z×Z_{2}. Up to reversal of orientation, the only homology classes which contain simple-closed curves are as follows: (0,0), (1,0), (1,1), (2,0), (0,1). Up to reversal of the orientation of a simple closed curve, if it lies within one of the two cross-caps that make up the Klein bottle, then it is in homology class (1,0) or (1,1); if it cuts the Klein bottle into two Möbius strips, then it is in homology class (2,0); if it cuts the Klein bottle into an annulus, then it is in homology class (0,1); and if bounds a disk, then it is in homology class (0,0).

== Parametrization ==
The "figure 8" immersion of the Klein bottle.

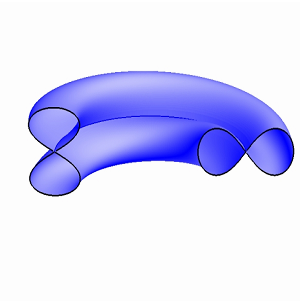
Klein bagel cross section, showing a figure eight curve (the lemniscate of Gerono).

=== The figure 8 immersion ===
To make the "figure 8" or "bagel" immersion of the Klein bottle, one can start with a Möbius strip and curl it to bring the edge to the midline; since there is only one edge, it will meet itself there, passing through the midline. It has a particularly simple parametrization as a "figure-8" torus with a half-twist:

$$\begin{align}
x & = \left(r + \cos\frac{\theta}{2}\sin v - \sin\frac{\theta}{2}\sin 2v\right) \cos \theta\\
y & = \left(r + \cos\frac{\theta}{2}\sin v - \sin\frac{\theta}{2}\sin 2v\right) \sin \theta\\
z & = \sin\frac{\theta}{2}\sin v + \cos\frac{\theta}{2}\sin 2v
\end{align}$$
for 0 ≤ θ < 2π, 0 ≤ v < 2π and r > 2.

In this immersion, the self-intersection circle (where sin(v) is zero) is a geometric circle in the xy plane. The positive constant r is the radius of this circle. The parameter θ gives the angle in the xy plane as well as the rotation of the figure 8, and v specifies the position around the 8-shaped cross section. With the above parametrization the cross section is a 2:1 Lissajous curve.

=== 4-D non-intersecting ===
A non-intersecting 4-D parametrization can be modeled after that of the flat torus:
$$\begin{align}
x & = R\left(\cos\frac{\theta}{2}\cos v - \sin\frac{\theta}{2}\sin 2v\right) \\
y & = R\left(\sin\frac{\theta}{2}\cos v + \cos\frac{\theta}{2}\sin 2v\right) \\
z & = P\cos\theta\left(1 + \varepsilon\sin v\right) \\
w & = P\sin\theta\left(1 + {\varepsilon}\sin v\right)
\end{align}$$

where R and P are constants that determine aspect ratio, θ and v are similar to as defined above. v determines the position around the figure-8 as well as the position in the x-y plane. θ determines the rotational angle of the figure-8 as well and the position around the z-w plane. ε is any small constant and ε sinv is a small v dependent bump in z-w space to avoid self intersection. The v bump causes the self intersecting 2-D/planar figure-8 to spread out into a 3-D stylized "potato chip" or saddle shape in the x-y-w and x-y-z space viewed edge on. When ε=0 the self intersection is a circle in the z-w plane <0, 0, cosθ, sinθ>.

=== 3D pinched torus / 4D Möbius tube ===
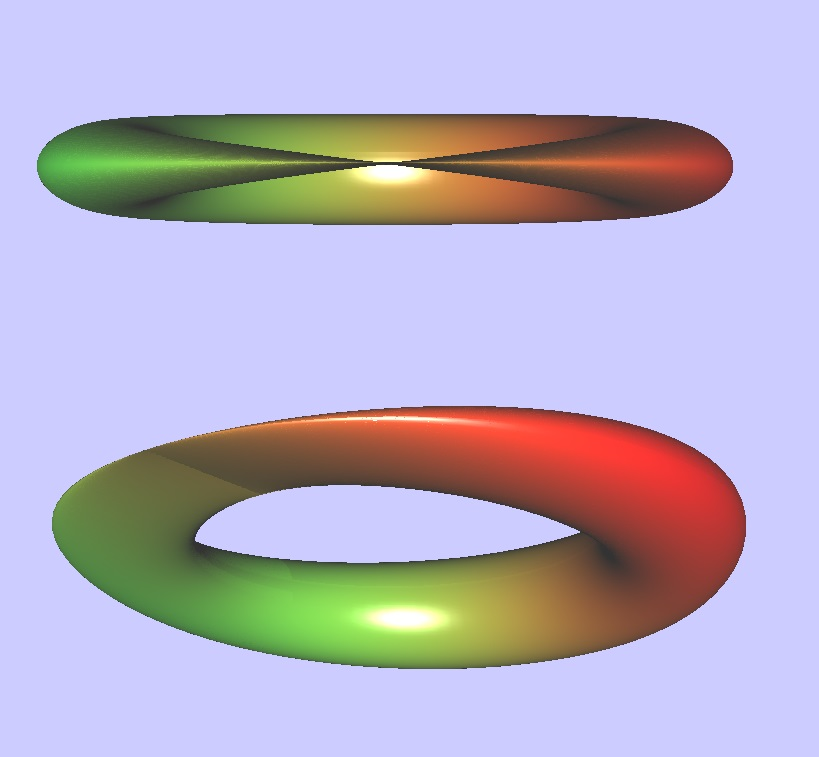
The pinched torus immersion of the Klein bottle

The pinched torus is perhaps the simplest parametrization of the Klein bottle in both three and four dimensions. It can be viewed as a variant of a torus that, in three dimensions, flattens and passes through itself on one side. Unfortunately, in three dimensions this parametrization has two pinch points, which makes it undesirable for some applications. In four dimensions the z amplitude rotates into the w amplitude and there are no self intersections or pinch points.

$$\begin{align}
x(\theta, \varphi) &= (R + r \cos \theta) \cos{\varphi} \\
y(\theta, \varphi) &= (R + r \cos \theta) \sin{\varphi} \\
z(\theta, \varphi) &= r \sin \theta \cos\left(\frac{\varphi}{2}\right) \\
w(\theta, \varphi) &= r \sin \theta \sin\left(\frac{\varphi}{2}\right)
\end{align}$$

One can view this as a tube or cylinder that wraps around, as in a torus, but its circular cross section flips over in four dimensions, presenting its "backside" as it reconnects, just as a Möbius strip cross section rotates before it reconnects. The 3D orthogonal projection of this is the pinched torus shown above. Just as a Möbius strip is a subset of a solid torus, the Möbius tube is a subset of a toroidally closed spherinder (solid spheritorus).

=== Bottle shape ===
The following parametrization of the usual 3-dimensional immersion of the bottle itself is much more complicated.

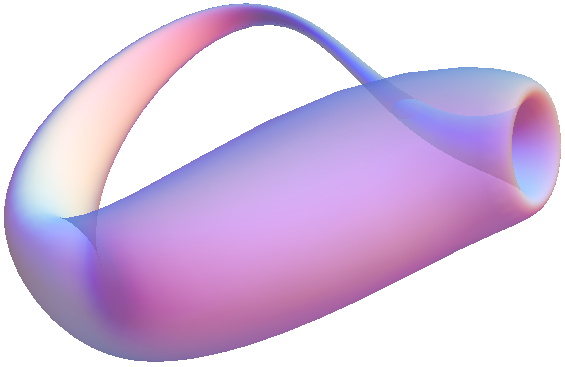
Klein Bottle with slight transparency

$$\begin{align}
x(u, v) = -&\frac{2}{15}\cos u \left(3\cos{v} - 30\sin{u} + 90\cos^4{u}\sin{u}\right. - \\
&\left.60\cos^6{u}\sin{u} + 5\cos{u}\cos{v}\sin{u}\right) \\[3pt]
y(u, v) = -&\frac{1}{15}\sin u \left(3\cos{v} - 3\cos^2{u}\cos{v} - 48\cos^4{u}\cos{v} + 48\cos^6{u}\cos{v}\right. -\\
&60\sin{u} + 5\cos{u}\cos{v}\sin{u} - 5\cos^3{u}\cos{v}\sin{u} -\\
&\left.80\cos^5{u}\cos{v}\sin{u} + 80\cos^7{u}\cos{v}\sin{u}\right) \\[3pt]
z(u, v) =  &\frac{2}{15} \left(3 + 5\cos{u}\sin{u}\right) \sin{v}
\end{align}$$
for 0 ≤ u < 2π and 0 ≤ v < 2π.

== Homotopy classes ==
Regular 3D immersions of the Klein bottle fall into three regular homotopy classes. The three are represented by:

- the "traditional" Klein bottle;
- the left-handed figure-8 Klein bottle;
- the right-handed figure-8 Klein bottle.

The traditional Klein bottle immersion is achiral. The figure-8 immersion is chiral. (The pinched torus immersion above is not regular, as it has pinch points, so it is not relevant to this section.)

If the traditional Klein bottle is cut in its plane of symmetry it breaks into two Möbius strips of opposite chirality. A figure-8 Klein bottle can be cut into two Möbius strips of the same chirality, and cannot be regularly deformed into its mirror image.

== Generalizations ==
The generalization of the Klein bottle to higher genus is given in the article on the fundamental polygon.

In another order of ideas, constructing 3-manifolds, it is known that a solid Klein bottle is homeomorphic to the Cartesian product of a Möbius strip and a closed interval. The solid Klein bottle is the non-orientable version of the solid torus, equivalent to $D^2 \times S^1.$

== See also ==
- Algebraic topology
- Alice universe
- Bavard's Klein bottle systolic inequality
- Boy's surface
- Ida surface
