= Solid Klein bottle =

Three-dimensional topological space

In mathematics, a solid Klein bottle is a three-dimensional topological space (a 3-manifold) whose boundary is the Klein bottle.

It is homeomorphic to the quotient space obtained by gluing the top disk of a cylinder $\scriptstyle D^2 \times I$ to the bottom disk by a reflection across a diameter of the disk.

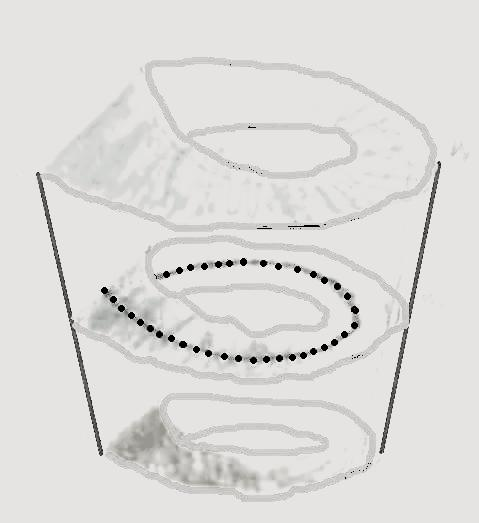
Mö x I: the circle of black points marks an absolute deformation retract of this space, and any regular neighbourhood of it has again boundary as a Klein bottle, so Mö x I is an onion of Klein bottles

Alternatively, one can visualize the solid Klein bottle as the trivial product $\scriptstyle M\ddot{o}\times I$, of the möbius strip and an interval $\scriptstyle I=[0,1]$. In this model one can see that the core central curve at 1/2 has a regular neighbourhood which is again a trivial cartesian product: $\scriptstyle M\ddot{o}\times[\frac{1}{2}-\varepsilon,\frac{1}{2}+\varepsilon]$ and whose boundary is a Klein bottle.

4D Visualization Through a Cylindrical Transformation

One approach to conceptualizing the solid klein bottle in four-dimensional space involves imagining a cylinder, which appears flat to a hypothetical four-dimensional observer. The cylinder possesses distinct "top" and "bottom" two-dimensional surfaces. By introducing a half-twist along the fourth dimension and subsequently connecting the ends, the cylinder undergoes a transformation. While the total volume of the object remains unchanged, the resulting structure is a continuous three-dimensional manifold - analogous to the way a Möbius strip is one continuous two-dimensional surface in three-dimensional space - and has the usual 2 dimensional Klein bottle manifold as its boundary.
