= A Topological Picturebook =

Book on mathematics

- Author: George K. Francis
- Publisher: Springer
- Publication date: 1987
- ISBN: 0387964266

A Topological Picturebook is a book on mathematical visualization in low-dimensional topology by George K. Francis. It was originally published by Springer in 1987, and reprinted in paperback in 2007. The Basic Library List Committee of the Mathematical Association of America has recommended its inclusion in undergraduate mathematics libraries.

== Topics ==
Although the book includes some computer-generated images, most of it is centered on hand drawing techniques. After an introductory chapter on topological surfaces, the cusps in the outlines of surfaces formed when viewing them from certain angles, and the self-intersections of immersed surfaces, the next two chapters are centered on drawing techniques: chapter two concerns ink, paper, cross-hatching, and shading techniques for indicating the curvature of surfaces, while chapter three provides some basic techniques of graphical perspective.

The remaining five chapters of the book provide case studies of different visualization problems in mathematics, called by the book "picture stories". The mathematical topics visualized in these chapters include the Penrose triangle and related optical illusions; the Roman surface and Boy's surface, two different immersions of the projective plane, and deformations between them; sphere eversion and the Morin surface; group theory, the mapping class groups of surfaces, and the braid groups; and knot theory, Seifert surfaces, the Hopf fibration of space by linked circles, and the construction of knot complements by gluing polyhedra.

== Audience and reception ==
Reviewer Athanase Papadopoulos calls the book "a drawing manual for mathematicians". However, reviewer Dave Auckly disagrees, writing that, although the book explains the principles of Francis's own visualizations, it is not really a practical guide to constructing visualizations more generally. Auckly also calls the chapter on perspective "a bizarre mix of mathematical formulas and artistic constructions". Nevertheless, he reviews it positively as "mathematics book loaded with pictures", aimed at undergraduates interested in mathematics.

More generally, Bill Satzer suggests that the book can provide inspiration for other mathematical illustrators, and for how mathematics is taught and imagined, and Dušan Repovš sees the book as an encouragement to professional mathematicians to more heavily illustrate their work. Jeffrey Weeks sees the book as an embodiment of the principle that abstract mathematical results can often be best appreciated through concrete examples. Thomas Banchoff writes that most readers from a general audience will be "captivated" by the intricate artworks of the book, and professional mathematicians will find sufficient depth in its explanation of these works. However, Weeks writes that the book fails at another stated purpose, allowing artists to appreciate the mathematics behind the artworks it presents, because the mathematics is too advanced for easy understanding by a general audience.
