= Cinematic scientific visualization =

Process of visualizing scientific data using filmmaking techniques

Cinematic scientific visualization (CSV) is the visual presentation of scientific data in a way that is typically associated with non-scientific filmmaking techniques including cinematography, lighting, and composition. Cinematic scientific visualizations are often created for purposes of science communication to the general public, e.g. through museum exhibits and documentary films. CSV is considered a subfield of scientific visualization, although the creation methods and visual outputs differ due to CSV's heavy emphasis on aesthetics and design.

== Differences from traditional scientific visualization ==
Traditional scientific visualization and cinematic scientific visualization differ in a number of important ways:

Differences between traditional and cinematic scientific visualization
	Traditional Scientific Visualization	Cinematic Scientific Visualization
Purpose	Data analysis	Science communication
Audience	Scientists	General public
Visual Style	Didactic, diagramatic	Photorealistic, cinematic
Development Platform	Scientific tools (e.g. ParaView, VisIt)	Visual effects software (e.g. Houdini, Autodesk Maya)

== History ==
The first large scale broadly-distributed cinematic scientific visualization appeared in the IMAX film Cosmic Voyage in 1996, though at the time this was simply referred to as a "scientific visualization" without the "cinematic" qualifier. The term "cinematic scientific visualization" was first published by Donna Cox in 2008 referring to work created by the Advanced Visualization Lab and was popularized by Kalina Borkiewicz of the same lab who published a series of papers, conference presentations, and interviews on the topic beginning in 2017. The term is now widely used to describe work done by NASA's Scientific Visualization Studio, Siemens Healthineers, NVIDIA, and others.

In 2014, the film Interstellar featured a cinematic scientific visualization of a physically-accurate black hole in a science fiction film.
