= Clifford parallel =

Lines with constant perpendicular distance between them

In elliptic geometry, two lines are Clifford parallel or paratactic lines if the perpendicular distance between them is constant from point to point. The concept was first studied by William Kingdon Clifford in elliptic space and appears only in spaces of at least three dimensions. Since parallel lines have the property of equidistance, the term "parallel" was appropriated from Euclidean geometry, although the "lines" of elliptic geometry are geodesic curves and, unlike the lines of Euclidean geometry, are of finite length.

The algebra of quaternions provides a descriptive geometry of elliptic space in which Clifford parallelism is made explicit. A Clifford bundle is a topological construction based on Clifford parallelism that was pointed out by Heinz Hopf in 1931

== Introduction ==
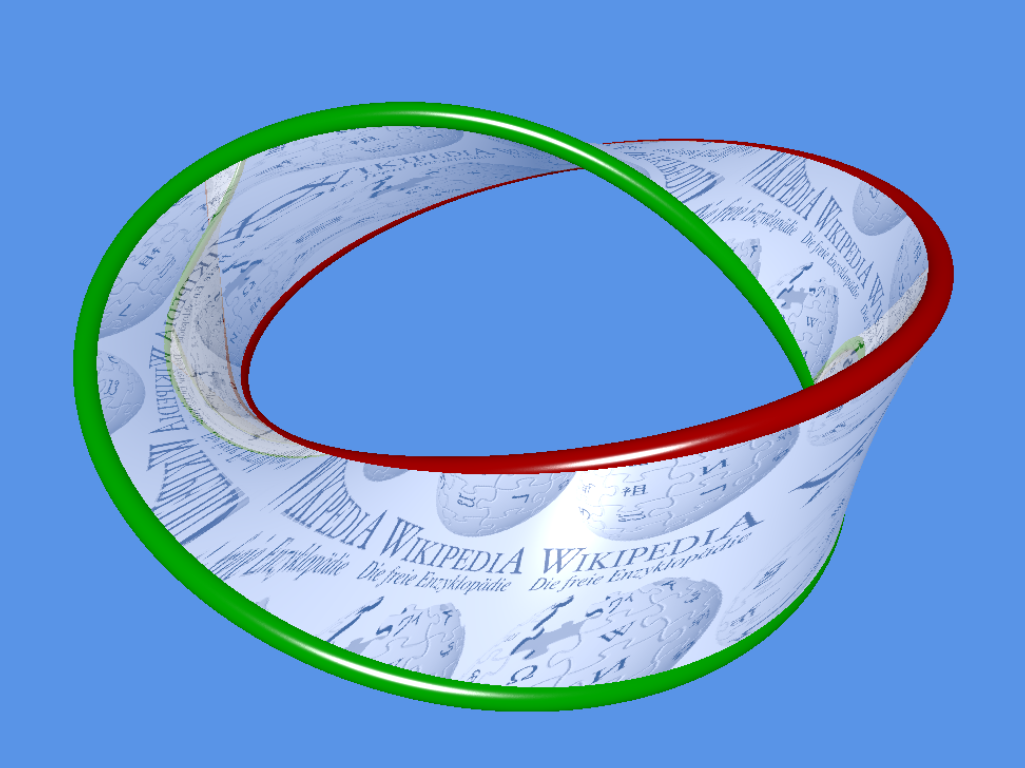
Two Clifford parallel great circles on the 3-sphere spanned by a twisted annulus. They have a common center point in 4-dimensional Euclidean space, and could lie in completely orthogonal rotation planes.

The lines on 1 in elliptic space are described by versors with a fixed axis r:

$$\lbrace e^{ar} :\ 0 \le a < \pi \rbrace$$

For an arbitrary point u in elliptic space, two Clifford parallels to this line pass through u. The right Clifford parallel is

$$\lbrace u e^{ar}:\ 0 \le a < \pi \rbrace,$$

and the left Clifford parallel is

$$\lbrace e^{ar}u:\ 0 \le a < \pi \rbrace.$$

== Generalized Clifford parallelism ==
Clifford's original definition was of curved parallel lines, but the concept generalizes to Clifford parallel objects of more than one dimension. In 4-dimensional Euclidean space Clifford parallel objects of 1, 2, 3 or 4 dimensions are related by isoclinic rotations. Clifford parallelism and isoclinic rotations are closely related aspects of the SO(4) symmetries which characterize the regular 4-polytopes.

== Clifford surfaces ==
Rotating a line about another, to which it is Clifford parallel, creates a Clifford surface.

The Clifford parallels through points on the surface all lie in the surface. A Clifford surface is thus a ruled surface since every point is on two lines, each contained in the surface.

Given two square roots of minus one in the quaternions, written r and s, the Clifford surface through them is given by

$$\lbrace e^{ar}e^{bs} :\ 0 \le a,b < \pi \rbrace.$$

== History ==
Clifford parallels were first described in 1873 by the English mathematician William Kingdon Clifford.

In 1900 Guido Fubini wrote his doctoral thesis on Clifford's parallelism in elliptic spaces.

In 1931 Heinz Hopf used Clifford parallels to construct the Hopf map.

In 2016 Hans Havlicek showed that there is a one-to-one correspondence between Clifford parallelisms and planes external to the Klein quadric.

== See also ==
- Clifford torus
- 24-cell § Clifford parallel polytopes
- Regular 4-polytopes
