= Otis Chodosh =

Mathematician

- Awards: New Horizons in Mathematics Prize (2026)

Academic background
- Education: Stanford University (Ph.D.)
- Thesis: The geometry of asymptotically hyperbolic manifolds (2015)
- Doctoral advisor: Simon Brendle; Michael Eichmair

Academic work
- Discipline: Mathematics
- Institutions: University of Stanford
- Main interests: Geometric analysis Partial differential equations
- Website: web.stanford.edu/~ochodosh/

Otis Avram Chodosh is a mathematician working in geometry and analysis of PDEs, and is known for his work on minimal surfaces. He is an associate professor at Stanford University. In 2026, he was awarded the New Horizons in Mathematics Prize.

== Education ==
He obtained his PhD at Stanford in 2015, with Simon Brendle and Michael Eichmair as advisors (thesis: The geometry of asymptotically hyperbolic manifolds). He has supervised three Ph.D. students.

== Honors and awards ==
In 2015, Chodosh was awarded the Walter J. Gores Award, Stanford's highest award for excellence in teaching.

He received a Sloan Fellowship in 2020.

He was awarded a Frontiers of Science Award jointly with Christos Mantoulidis in 2024.

In 2026, he was awarded the New Horizons in Mathematics Prize, the citation reads "For contributions to differential geometry and the calculus of variations, including work on minimal surfaces and manifolds with positive scalar curvature.".

He delivered a lecture at the 2026 International Congress of Mathematicians.

== Selected publications ==
- Chodosh, Otis; Mantoulidis, Christos (2020). "Minimal surfaces and the Allen–Cahn equation on 3-manifolds: index, multiplicity, and curvature estimates". Annals of Mathematics. 191 (1). arXiv:1803.02716. doi:10.4007/annals.2020.191.1.4. ISSN 0003-486X.
- Chodosh, Otis; Li, Chao (2024). "Generalized soap bubbles and the topology of manifolds with positive scalar curvature". Annals of Mathematics. 199 (2). arXiv:2008.11888. doi:10.4007/annals.2024.199.2.3. ISSN 0003-486X.
- Chodosh, Otis; Li, Chao (2024). "Stable minimal hypersurfaces in $\R^4$". Acta Mathematica. 233 (1): 1–31. doi:10.4310/ACTA.2024.v233.n1.a1.
- Chodosh, Otis; Choi, Kyeongsu; Mantoulidis, Christos; Schulze, Felix (2024). "Mean curvature flow with generic initial data". Inventiones mathematicae. 237 (1): 121–220. arXiv:2003.14344. doi:10.1007/s00222-024-01258-0. ISSN 0020-9910.
