= Duocylinder =

4-dimensional object

Stereographic projection of the duocylinder's ridge (see below), as a flat torus. The ridge is rotating about the xw-plane.

The duocylinder, also called the double cylinder or the bidisc, is a geometric object embedded in 4-dimensional Euclidean space, defined as the Cartesian product of two disks of respective radii r_{1} and r_{2}:$D = \left\{ (x,y,z,w) \, \left| \, x^2+y^2\leq r_1^2,\ z^2+w^2\leq r_2^2 \right. \right\}$

It is similar to a cylinder in 3-space, which is the Cartesian product of a disk with a line segment. But unlike the cylinder, both hypersurfaces (of a regular duocylinder) are congruent.

Its polar dual is a duospindle, constructed as the convex hull of two circles, one in the xy-plane and the other in the zw-plane.

== Geometry ==
=== Bounding 3-manifolds ===
The duocylinder is bounded by two mutually perpendicular 3-manifolds with torus-like surfaces, respectively described by the formulae:

$$x^2 + y^2 = r_1^2, z^2 + w^2 \leq r_2^2$$

and

$$z^2 + w^2 = r_2^2, x^2 + y^2 \leq r_1^2$$

The duocylinder is so called because these two bounding 3-manifolds may be thought of as 3-dimensional cylinders 'bent around' in 4-dimensional space such that they form closed loops in the xy- and zw-planes. The duocylinder has rotational symmetry in both of these planes, and as such can be used to understand double rotations by unwrapping the duocylinder's surface into its two cylindrical cells - rotation through one of the planes of symmetry translates one cylinder while rotating the other, and so in a double rotation, both cylinders rotate and translate.

A regular duocylinder consists of two congruent cells, one square flat torus face (the ridge), zero edges, and zero vertices.

=== The ridge ===
The ridge of the duocylinder is the 2-manifold that is the boundary between the two bounding (solid) torus cells. It is in the shape of a Clifford torus, which is the Cartesian product of two circles. Intuitively, it may be constructed as follows: Roll a 2-dimensional rectangle into a cylinder, so that its top and bottom edges meet. Then roll the cylinder in the plane perpendicular to the 3-dimensional hyperplane that the cylinder lies in, so that its two circular ends meet.

The resulting shape is topologically equivalent to a Euclidean 2-torus (a doughnut shape). However, unlike the latter, all parts of its surface are identically deformed. On the (2D surface, embedded in 3D) doughnut, the surface around the 'doughnut hole' is deformed with negative curvature (like a saddle) while the surface outside is deformed with positive curvature (like a sphere).

The ridge of the duocylinder may be thought of as the actual global shape of the screens of video games such as Asteroids, where going off the edge of one side of the screen leads to the other side. It cannot be embedded without distortion in 3-dimensional space, because it requires two degrees of freedom ("directions") in addition to its inherent 2-dimensional surface in order for both pairs of edges to be joined.

The duocylinder can be constructed from the 3-sphere by "slicing" off the bulge of the 3-sphere on either side of the ridge. The analog of this on the 2-sphere is to draw minor latitude circles at ±45 degrees and slicing off the bulge between them, leaving a cylindrical wall, and slicing off the tops, leaving flat tops. This operation is equivalent to removing select vertices/pyramids from polytopes, but since the 3-sphere is smooth/regular you have to generalize the operation.

The dihedral angle between the two 3-dimensional hypersurfaces on either side of the ridge is 90 degrees.

=== Projections ===
Parallel projections of the duocylinder into 3-dimensional space and its cross-sections with 3-dimensional space both form cylinders. Perspective projections of the duocylinder form torus-like shapes with the 'doughnut hole' filled in.

=== Relation to other shapes ===
The duocylinder is the limiting shape of duoprisms as the number of sides in the constituent polygonal prisms approaches infinity. The duoprisms therefore serve as good polytopic approximations of the duocylinder.

In 3-space, a cylinder can be considered intermediate between a cube and a sphere. In 4-space there are three Cartesian products that in the same sense are intermediate between the tesseract (1-ball × 1-ball × 1-ball × 1-ball) and the hypersphere (4-ball). They are:

- the cubinder (2-ball × 1-ball × 1-ball), whose surface consists of four cylindrical cells and one square torus.
- the spherinder (3-ball × 1-ball), whose surface consists of three cells—two spheres, and the region in between.
- the duocylinder (2-ball × 2-ball), whose surface consists of two toroidal cells.

The duocylinder is the only one of the above three that is regular. These constructions correspond to the five partitions of 4, the number of dimensions.

== See also ==
- Clifford torus
- Duoprism
- Flat torus
- Hopf fibration
- Manifold
