= Simon Brendle =

German mathematician

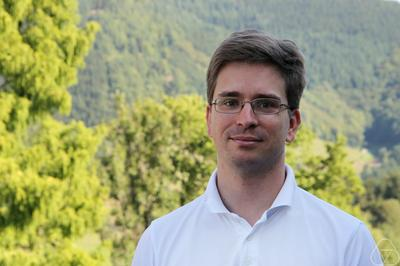
- Brendle at Oberwolfach, 2015
- Born: June 1981 (age 45)
- Education: University of Tübingen
- Known for: Yamabe flow, differentiable sphere theorem, Lawson conjecture, singularity formation in mean curvature flow and Ricci flow, Min-Oo conjecture
- Awards: EMS Prize (2012); Bôcher Prize (2014); Simons Investigator Award (2017); Fermat Prize (2017); Breakthrough Prize in Mathematics (2024)
- Scientific career
- Fields: Mathematics
- Workplaces: Columbia University; Stanford University
- Thesis: Krümmungsflüsse auf Mannigfaltigkeiten mit Rand (2001)
- Doctoral advisor: Gerhard Huisken
- Doctoral students: Otis Chodosh

Simon Brendle (born June 1981) is a German-American mathematician working in differential geometry and nonlinear partial differential equations. At the age of 19, he received his Dr. rer. nat. from Tübingen University under the supervision of Gerhard Huisken (2001). He was a professor at Stanford University (2005–2016), and is currently a professor at Columbia University. He has held visiting positions at MIT, ETH Zürich, Princeton University, and Cambridge University.

== Contributions to mathematics ==
Simon Brendle has solved major open problems regarding the Yamabe equation in conformal geometry. This includes his counterexamples to the compactness conjecture for the Yamabe problem, and the proof of the convergence of the Yamabe flow in all dimensions (conjectured by Richard Hamilton). In 2007, he proved the differentiable sphere theorem (in collaboration with Richard Schoen), a fundamental problem in global differential geometry. In 2012, he proved the Hsiang–Lawson's conjecture, a longstanding problem in minimal surface theory. He has also worked on singularity formation in the mean curvature flow and Ricci flow, solving a question concerning the uniqueness of self-similar solutions to the Ricci flow which arose in the context of Grigori Perelman's work.

== Honors and awards ==
He received an Alfred P. Sloan Fellowship in 2006. For his contributions to differential geometry he was awarded an EMS Prize in 2012. He delivered the 2012 Euler Lecture and the 2011 Takagi Lectures. He was named as the recipient of the 2014 Bôcher Prize of the American Mathematical Society. In 2017, he received a Simons Investigator Award and the Fermat Prize. In 2023, he received the Breakthrough Prize in Mathematics. In 2026 he was elected to the National Academy of Sciences.

== Main publications ==
- "Blow-up phenomena for the Yamabe equation", Journal of the AMS 21, pp. 951–979, 2008 doi:10.1090/S0894-0347-07-00575-9
- "Convergence of the Yamabe flow in dimension 6 and higher", Inventiones Mathematicae 170, pp. 541–576, 2007 doi:10.1007/s00222-007-0074-x
- (joint with R. Schoen) "Manifolds with 1/4 pinched curvature are space forms", Journal of the AMS, 22, 2009, pp. 287 (Differentiable Sphere Theorem) doi:10.1090/S0894-0347-08-00613-9
- Ricci Flow and the Sphere Theorem, American Mathematical Society, Graduate Studies in Mathematics, vol. 111, 2010
- (joint with R. Schoen) "Curvature, sphere theorem and the Ricci flow", Bulletin of the AMS, 48, 2011, pp. 1–32, Online
- (joint with R. Schoen) Riemannian manifolds of positive curvature, Proceedings of the International Congress of Mathematicians (ICM 2010), Hyderabad, India, August 19–27, 2010. Vol. I, pp. 449–475, 2011
- (joint with F. C. Marques, A. Neves) "Deformations of the hemisphere that increase scalar curvature", Inventiones Mathematicae 185, 2011, pp. 175–197, Preprint (Min-Oo Conjecture)
- "Rotational symmetry of self-similar solutions to the Ricci flow" Inventiones Mathematicae 194, 2013, pp. 731–764 doi:10.1007/s00222-013-0457-0
- "Embedded minimal tori in $S^3$ and the Lawson conjecture", Acta Mathematica 211, 2013, pp. 177–190, Preprint (Lawson Conjecture)
- "Embedded self-similar shrinkers of genus 0", Annals of Mathematics 183, 715-728 (2016) Preprint
