= Spherinder =

Geometric object

The spherinder can be seen as the volume between two parallel and equal solid 2-spheres (3-balls) in 4-dimensional space, here stereographically projected into 3D.

In four-dimensional geometry, the spherinder, or spherical cylinder or spherical prism, is a geometric object, defined as the Cartesian product of a 3-ball (or solid 2-sphere) of radius r_{1} and a line segment of length 2r_{2}:

$$D = \{ (x,y,z,w) | x^2+y^2+z^2\leq r_1^2,\ w^2\leq r_2^2 \}$$

Like the duocylinder, it is also analogous to a cylinder in 3-space, which is the Cartesian product of a disk with a line segment.

It can be seen in 3-dimensional space by stereographic projection as two concentric spheres, in a similar way that a tesseract (cubic prism) can be projected as two concentric cubes, and how a circular cylinder can be projected into 2-dimensional space as two concentric circles.

== Spherindrical coordinate system ==
One can define a "spherindrical" coordinate system (r, θ, φ, w), consisting of spherical coordinates with an extra coordinate w. This is analogous to how cylindrical coordinates are defined: r and φ being polar coordinates with an elevation coordinate z. Spherindrical coordinates can be converted to Cartesian coordinates using the formulas
$$\begin{align}
x &= r \cos \varphi \sin \theta \\
y &= r \sin \varphi \sin \theta \\
z &= r \cos \theta \\
w &= w
\end{align}$$
where r is the radius, θ is the zenith angle, φ is the azimuthal angle, and w is the height. Cartesian coordinates can be converted to spherindrical coordinates using the formulas
$$\begin{align}
r &= \sqrt{x^2+y^2+z^2} \\
\varphi &= \arctan{\frac{y}{x}} \\
\theta &= \arccot{\frac{z}{\sqrt{x^2+y^2}}} \\
w &= w
\end{align}$$
The hypervolume element for spherindrical coordinates is $\mathrm{d}H = r^2\sin{\theta}\,\mathrm{d}r\,\mathrm{d}\theta\,\mathrm{d}\varphi\,\mathrm{d}w,$ which can be derived by computing the Jacobian.

== Measurements ==
=== Hypervolume ===
Given a spherinder with a spherical base of radius r and a height h, the hypervolume of the spherinder is given by
$$H=\frac{4}{3}\pi r^3 h$$

=== Surface volume ===
The surface volume of a spherinder, like the surface area of a cylinder, is made up of three parts:

- the volume of the top base: $\frac{4}{3} \pi r^3$
- the volume of the bottom base: $\frac{4}{3} \pi r^3$
- the volume of the lateral 3D surface: $4 \pi r^2 h$, which is the surface area of the spherical base times the height

Therefore, the total surface volume is

$$SV=\frac{8}{3}\pi r^3 + 4\pi r^2 h$$

=== Proof ===
The above formulas for hypervolume and surface volume can be proven using integration. The hypervolume of an arbitrary 4D region is given by the quadruple integral
$$H=\iiiint\limits_{D} \mathrm{d}H$$

The hypervolume of the spherinder can be integrated over spherindrical coordinates.
$$H_\mathrm{spherinder}=\iiiint\limits_{D} \mathrm{d}H = \int_{0}^{h}\int_{0}^{2\pi}\int_{0}^{\pi}\int_{0}^{R}r^2\sin{\theta}\,\mathrm{d}r\,\mathrm{d}\theta\,\mathrm{d}\varphi\,\mathrm{d}w = \frac{4}{3}\pi R^3 h$$

== Related 4-polytopes ==
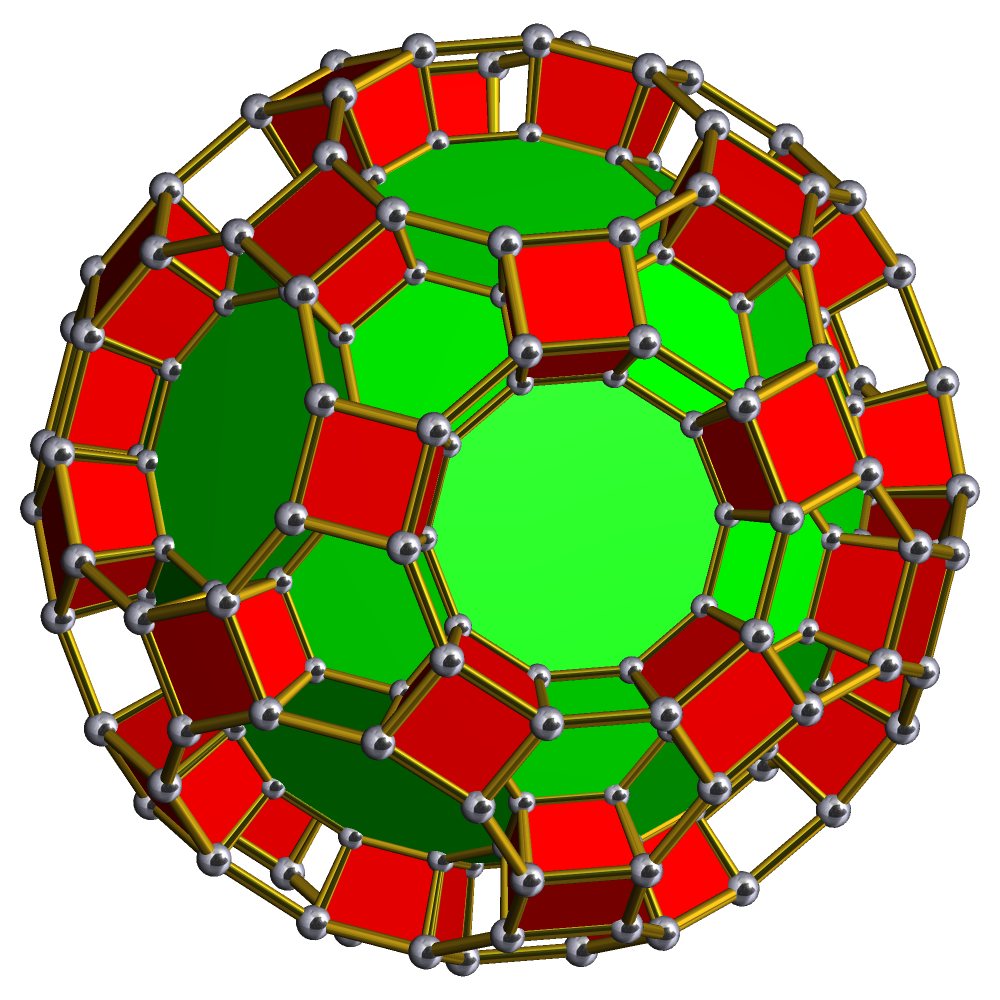
The related truncated icosidodecahedral prism is constructed from two truncated icosidodecahedra connected by prisms, shown here in stereographic projection with some prisms hidden.

The spherinder is related to the uniform prismatic polychora, which are Cartesian products of a regular or semiregular polyhedron and a line segment. There are eighteen convex uniform prisms based on the Platonic and Archimedean solids (tetrahedral prism, truncated tetrahedral prism, cubic prism, cuboctahedral prism, octahedral prism, rhombicuboctahedral prism, truncated cubic prism, truncated octahedral prism, truncated cuboctahedral prism, snub cubic prism, dodecahedral prism, icosidodecahedral prism, icosahedral prism, truncated dodecahedral prism, rhombicosidodecahedral prism, truncated icosahedral prism, truncated icosidodecahedral prism, snub dodecahedral prism), plus an infinite family based on antiprisms, and another infinite family of uniform duoprisms, which are products of two regular polygons.

== See also ==
- Clifford torus
