= Donna Cox =

American artist and scientist

Donna J. Cox is an American artist and scientist, Michael Aiken Endowed Chair; Professor of Art + Design; Director, Advanced Visualization Lab at the University of Illinois at Urbana-Champaign (UIUC); Director, Visualization and Experimental Technologies at National Center for Supercomputing Applications (NCSA); and Director, edream (Illinois Emerging Digital Research and Education in Arts Media Institute). She is a recognized pioneer in computer art and scientific visualization, specifically cinematic scientific visualization.

== Biography ==
Donna Cox received a B.A. in 1982 and a Master of Fine Arts degree in 1985, both from the University of Wisconsin–Madison.

In 1985 she became a visiting assistant professor at UIUC, in 1990 associate professor at the School of Art + Design, and in 1992 a full professor. In the same period she started as an adjunct professor and Research Artist/Scientist at the National Center for Supercomputing Applications (NCSA) in 1985, became an associate director for Education in 1989, co-director, Scientific Communications and Media Systems in 1992, Director of the Virtual Director Group in 1997 and Director, Visualization and Experimental Technologies in 2002 and since 2006 Director, Advanced Visualization Laboratory at the NCSA. From 1989 to 1996 she was Project Leader/PI, Renaissance Experimental Lab, at the NCSA.

Donna Cox is honored at the Chicago Museum of Science and Industry as one of 40 selected modern-day Leonardo da Vinci's. In 2008, she received the first Michael Aiken Endowed Chair.

In 2014, Cox received a $1.5 million grant from the National Science Foundation to lead a team based at NCSA to develop museum shows and science documentaries with visualizations of big data, working with research teams around the world. The project includes an interdisciplinary, creative team of producers, technologists, artists and educators who will collaborate with scientists and researchers across the country to raise public awareness about the Centrality of Advanced Digitally ENabled Science (CADENS). The grant will fund three "ultra-high-resolution" digital museum shows that will play around the world, as well as nine high-definition documentaries to be distributed online via YouTube, Hulu and other outlets. The museum shows will premiere at giant-screen, "fulldome" theaters and will be scaled for wider distribution to smaller theaters at museums, planetariums, science centers and universities.

She was awarded the ACM SIGGRAPH Distinguished Artist Award for Lifetime Achievement in Digital Art in 2019.

== Projects and Achievements ==
Academy Award nominee in the Documentary (Short Subject) category for her work on the 1996 IMAX film Cosmic Voyage.

Donna Cox helped visualize galaxies for the 2010 IMAX documentary Hubble.

Donna Cox collaborated with the director Terrence Malick on the birth of the universe and Milky Way fly-through sequences in the 2011 award-winning film, The Tree of Life with Brad Pitt.

Donna Cox served as an Art Director for the 2016 IMAX film A Beautiful Planet.

Donna Cox was one of a handful of collaborators on the musical theater work The Demo by composer/performers Mikel Rouse and Ben Neill. This work provides a re-imaging of the classic technology demo given in 1968 by Douglas Engelbart.

She collaborated with the National Center for Supercomputing Applications and the Denver Museum of Nature and Science to create the film "Black Holes: The Other Side of Infinity" which exhibited in 2005.

== Publications ==
Donna Cox has written several articles, chapters in books and papers. A selection:

- 1987. "Computer Art/Design Curricula in Universities: Beyond the Traditional Approach," D. Cox, Teaching Computer Graphics: An Interdisciplinary Approach, SIGGRAPH 87 Educator's Workshop Proceedings, July 27, 1987, p. 207-233.
- 1988. "Renaissance Teams and Scientific Visualization: A Convergence of Art and Science". In: Collaboration in Computer Graphics Education, SIGGRAPH 88 Educator's Workshop Proceedings, D. Cox, August 1–5, 1988, p. 81 - 104; plus two colorplates, three black/white illustrations.
- 1990. "The Art of Scientific Visualization," in: Academic Computing, Volume 4, Number 6, March 1990, p. 20-22 and 32–40. Includes cover image.
- 1992. "Collaborative Computer Graphics Education," In: Interactive Learning Through Visualization: The Impact of Computer Graphics in Education. Cunningham, S. and Hubbold, R.J. (Eds.)
- 1995. "Education and Collaboration in an Evolving Digital Culture," in: Science Visualization in Math Teaching, Chapter 12, Association for the Advancement of Computing in Education (AACE.
- 2003. “Metaphorical Vestiges on Info-Viz Trails,” In: Proceedings of the Consciousness Reframed Conference, July 2–5, 2003, Newport, Wales.
- 2006. "Visualization and Visual Metaphors,” book chapter in Aesthetic Computing, ed. Paul Fishwick, MIT Press/Leonardo Books, 2006, p 89-14
- 2023. "Renaissance Teams and the Art of Scientific Visualization" lecture for the University of Illinois Urbana-Champaign, Women in Science Lecture Series, October 12, 2023
