= Clifford torus =

Geometrical object in four-dimensional space

A stereographic projection of a Clifford torus performing a simple rotation

Topologically a rectangle is the fundamental polygon of a torus, with opposite edges sewn together.

In differential geometry, the Clifford torus is the standard embedding of the 2-torus as a product of circles in Euclidean space R^{4} (equivalently C^{2}). For radii a,b>0 it can be written as S^{1}(a) × S^{1}(b) ⊂ R^{2} × R^{2} ≅R^{4}, or in complex coordinates as the set of (z_{1},z_{2}) with $|z_1|=a$ and $|z_2|=b$. With the induced metric it is a flat torus (its Gaussian curvature vanishes), isometric to a rectangular torus; when a=b it is a square torus.

If a^{2}+b^{2}=1, then T_{a,b} lies in the unit 3-sphere S^{3} ⊂ R^{4}. The case a=b=1/√2 is a minimal surface in S^{3} and is often called the minimal Clifford torus; its images under the isometries of S^{3} are also minimal. The Clifford torus is named after William Kingdon Clifford and is closely related to Clifford parallelism and the Hopf fibration.

A flat 2-torus admits no C^{2} (in particular, no smooth) isometric embedding into R^{3}, but by the Nash–Kuiper theorem it does admit C^{1} isometric embeddings into R^{3} (constructed via convex integration).

== Formal definition ==
The unit circle S^{1} in R^{2} can be parameterized by an angle coordinate:

$$S^1 = \bigl\{ ( \cos\theta, \sin\theta ) \,\big|\, 0 \leq \theta < 2\pi \bigr\}.$$

In another copy of R^{2}, take another copy of the unit circle

$$S^1 = \bigl\{ ( \cos\varphi, \sin\varphi ) \,\big|\, 0 \leq \varphi < 2\pi \bigr\}.$$

Then the Clifford torus is

$$\tfrac{1}{\sqrt{2}}S^1 \times \tfrac{1}{\sqrt{2}} S^1 = \left\{\left. \tfrac{1}{\sqrt{2}} ( \cos\theta, \sin\theta, \cos\varphi, \sin\varphi )\in \mathbb R^4 \,\right|\, 0 \leq \theta < 2\pi, 0 \leq \varphi < 2\pi \right\}.$$

Since each copy of S^{1} is an embedded submanifold of R^{2}, the Clifford torus is an embedded torus in R^{2} × R^{2} = R^{4}.

If R^{4} is given by coordinates (x_{1}, y_{1}, x_{2}, y_{2}), then the Clifford torus is given by

$$x_1^2 + y_1^2 = x_2^2 + y_2^2 = \tfrac{1}{2}.$$

This shows that in R^{4} the Clifford torus is a submanifold of the unit 3-sphere S^{3}.

It is easy to verify that the Clifford torus is a minimal surface in S^{3}.

=== Alternative derivation using complex numbers ===
It is also common to consider the Clifford torus as an embedded torus in C^{2}. In two copies of C, we have the following unit circles (still parametrized by an angle coordinate):

$$S^1 = \left\{\left. e^{i\theta} \,\right|\, 0 \leq \theta < 2\pi \right\}$$

and

$$S^1 = \left\{\left. e^{i\varphi} \,\right|\, 0 \leq \varphi < 2\pi \right\}.$$

Now the Clifford torus appears as

$$\tfrac{1}{\sqrt{2}}S^1 \times \tfrac{1}{\sqrt{2}}S^1 = \left\{\left. \tfrac{1}{\sqrt{2}} \left( e^{i\theta}, e^{i\varphi} \right) \, \right| \, 0 \leq \theta < 2\pi, 0 \leq \varphi < 2\pi \right\}.$$

As before, this is an embedded submanifold, in the unit sphere S^{3} in C^{2}.

If C^{2} is given by coordinates (z_{1}, z_{2}), then the Clifford torus is given by

$$\left| z_1 \right|^2 = \left| z_2 \right|^2 = \tfrac{1}{2}.$$

In the Clifford torus as defined above, the distance of any point of the Clifford torus to the origin of C^{2} is

$$\sqrt{ \tfrac{1}{2}\left| e^{i\theta} \right|^2 + \tfrac{1}{2}\left| e^{i\varphi} \right|^2} = 1.$$

The set of all points at a distance of 1 from the origin of C^{2} is the unit 3-sphere, and so the Clifford torus sits inside this 3-sphere. In fact, the Clifford torus divides this 3-sphere into two congruent solid tori (see Heegaard splitting).

Since O(4) acts on R^{4} by orthogonal transformations, we can move the "standard" Clifford torus defined above to other equivalent tori via rigid rotations. These are all called "Clifford tori". The six-dimensional group O(4) acts transitively on the space of all such Clifford tori sitting inside the 3-sphere. However, this action has a two-dimensional stabilizer (see group action) since rotation in the meridional and longitudinal directions of a torus preserves the torus (as opposed to moving it to a different torus). Hence, there is actually a four-dimensional space of Clifford tori. In fact, there is a one-to-one correspondence between Clifford tori in the unit 3-sphere and pairs of polar great circles (i.e., great circles that are maximally separated). Given a Clifford torus, the associated polar great circles are the core circles of each of the two complementary regions. Conversely, given any pair of polar great circles, the associated Clifford torus is the locus of points of the 3-sphere that are equidistant from the two circles.

== More general definition of Clifford tori ==
The flat tori in the unit 3-sphere S^{3} that are the product of circles of radius r in one 2-plane R^{2} and radius √1 − r^{2} in another 2-plane R^{2} are sometimes also called "Clifford tori".

The same circles may be thought of as having radii that are cos θ and sin θ for some angle θ in the range 0 ≤ θ ≤ π/2 (where we include the degenerate cases θ = 0 and θ = π/2).

The union for 0 ≤ θ ≤ π/2 of all of these tori of form

$$T_\theta = S(\cos\theta)\times S(\sin\theta)$$

(where S(r) denotes the circle in the plane R^{2} defined by having center (0, 0) and radius r) is the 3-sphere S^{3}. Note that we must include the two degenerate cases θ = 0 and θ = π/2, each of which corresponds to a great circle of S^{3}, and which together constitute a pair of polar great circles.

This torus T_{θ} is readily seen to have area

$$\operatorname{area}\left(T_\theta\right) = 4\pi^2\cos\theta\sin\theta = 2\pi^2\sin2\theta,$$

so only the torus T_{π/4} has the maximum possible area of 2π^{2}. This torus T_{π/4} is the torus T_{θ} that is most commonly called the "Clifford torus" – and it is also the only one of the T_{θ} that is a minimal surface in S^{3}.

== Still more general definition of Clifford tori in higher dimensions ==
Any unit sphere S^{2n−1} in an even-dimensional euclidean space R^{2n} = C^{n} may be expressed in terms of the complex coordinates as follows:

$$S^{2n-1} = \left\{(z_1, \ldots, z_n) \in \mathbf{C}^n : |z_1|^2 + \cdots + |z_n|^2 = 1\right\}.$$

Then, for any non-negative numbers r_{1}, ..., r_{n} such that r_{1}^{2} + ... + r_{n}^{2} = 1, we may define a generalized Clifford torus as follows:

$$T_{r_1,\ldots,r_n} = \bigl\{(z_1, \ldots, z_n) \in \mathbf{C}^n : |z_k| = r_k,~1 \leqslant k \leqslant n\bigr\}.$$

These generalized Clifford tori are all disjoint from one another. We may once again conclude that the union of each one of these tori T_{r_{1}, ..., r_{n}} is the unit (2n − 1)-sphere S^{2n−1} (where we must again include the degenerate cases where at least one of the radii r_{k} = 0).

== Properties ==
- The Clifford torus is "flat": Every point has a neighborhood that can be flattened out onto a piece of the plane without distortion, unlike the standard torus of revolution.
- The Clifford torus divides the 3-sphere into two congruent solid tori. (In a stereographic projection, the Clifford torus appears as a standard torus of revolution. The fact that it divides the 3-sphere equally means that the interior of the projected torus is equivalent to the exterior.)

== Uses in mathematics ==
In symplectic geometry, the Clifford torus gives an example of an embedded Lagrangian submanifold of C^{2} with the standard symplectic structure. (Of course, any product of embedded circles in C gives a Lagrangian torus of C^{2}, so these need not be Clifford tori.)

The Lawson conjecture states that every minimally embedded torus in the 3-sphere with the round metric must be a Clifford torus. A proof of this conjecture was published by Simon Brendle in 2013.

Clifford tori and their images under conformal transformations are the global minimizers of the Willmore functional.

== Alternative embeddings ==
Although having a different geometry than the standard embedding of a torus in three-dimensional Euclidean space, the square torus can also be embedded into three-dimensional space, by the Nash embedding theorem; one possible embedding modifies the standard torus by a fractal set of ripples running in two perpendicular directions along the surface.

== See also ==
- Duocylinder
- Hopf fibration
- Clifford parallel and Clifford surface
- William Kingdon Clifford
