= National Center for Supercomputing Applications =

Illinois-based applied supercomputing research organization

Coordinates: 40°6′53.4″N 88°13′30.0″W

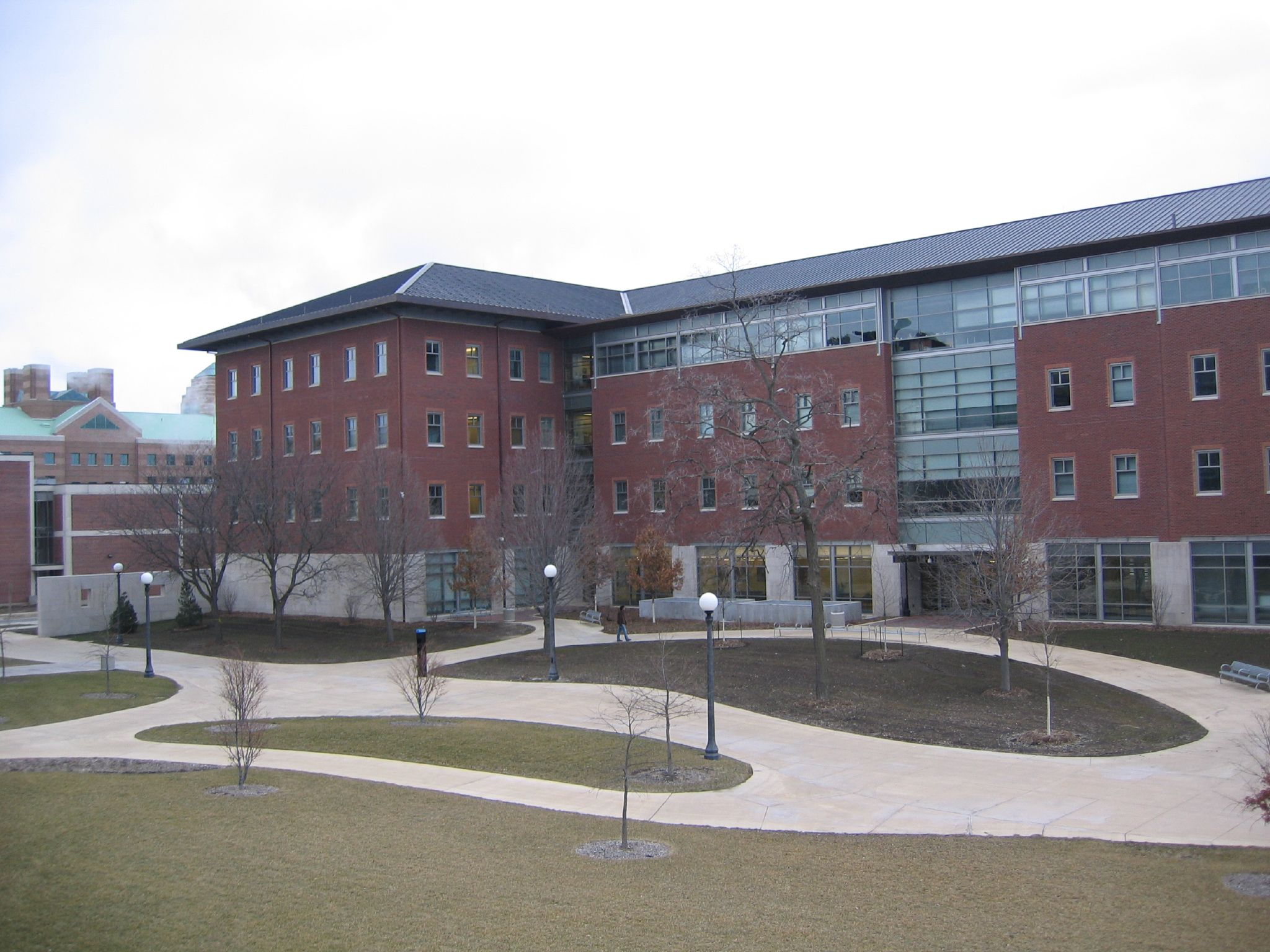
- NCSA Building, 1205 W. Clark St., Urbana, Illinois 61801
- Established: 1986
- Field of research: High-performance computing; Cyberinfrastructure; Cyber security; Scientific visualization
- Director: Rayadurgam Srikant
- Location: Urbana, Illinois, U.S.
- Affiliations: University of Illinois Urbana-Champaign
- Website: www.ncsa.illinois.edu

The National Center for Supercomputing Applications (NCSA) is a unit of the University of Illinois Urbana-Champaign, and provides high-performance computing resources to researchers in the United States. NCSA is currently led by Professor Rayadurgam Srikant.

== History ==
NCSA is one of the five original centers in the National Science Foundation's Supercomputer Centers Program. The idea for NCSA and the four other supercomputer centers arose from the frustration of its founder, Larry Smarr, who wrote an influential paper, "The Supercomputer Famine in American Universities", in 1982, after having to travel to Europe in summertime to access supercomputers and conduct his research.

Smarr wrote a proposal to address the future needs of scientific research. Seven other University of Illinois professors joined as co-principal investigators, and many others provided descriptions of what could be accomplished if the proposal were accepted. Known as the Black Proposal (after the color of its cover), it was submitted to the NSF in 1983. It met the NSF's mandate and its contents immediately generated excitement. However, the NSF had no organization in place to support it, and the proposal itself did not contain a clearly defined home for its implementation.

The NSF established an Office of Scientific Computing in 1984 and, with strong congressional support, it announced a national competition that would fund a set of supercomputer centers like the one described in the Black Proposal. The result was that four supercomputer centers would be chartered (Cornell, Illinois, Princeton, and San Diego), with a fifth (Pittsburgh) added later.

The Black Proposal was approved in 1985 and marked the foundation of NCSA, with $42,751,000 in funding from 1 January 1985 through 31 December 1989. This was also noteworthy in that the NSF's action of approving an unsolicited proposal was unprecedented. NCSA opened its doors in January 1986.

In 2007, NCSA was awarded a grant from the National Science Foundation to build "Blue Waters", a supercomputer capable of performing quadrillions of calculations per second, a level of performance known as petascale.

=== Black Proposal ===
Logo as of 2005

The 'Black Proposal' was a short, ten-page proposal for the creation of a supercomputing center that eventually led to funding from the National Science Foundation (NSF) to create supercomputing centers, including the National Center for Supercomputing Applications (NCSA) at the University of Illinois. In this sense, the significant role played by the U.S. Government in funding the center, and the first widely popular web browser (NCSA's Mosaic), cannot be denied.

The Black Proposal described the limitations on any scientific research that required computer capabilities, and it described a future world of productive scientific collaboration, centered on universal computer access, in which technical limitations on scientific research would not exist. Significantly, it expressed a clear vision of how to get from the present to the future. The proposal was titled "A Center for Scientific and Engineering Supercomputing", and was ten pages long.

The proposal's vision of the computing future were then unusual or non-existent, but elements of it are now commonplace, such as visualization, workstations, high-speed I/O, data storage, software engineering, and close collaboration with the multi-disciplinary user community.

At the time the proposal was written, computers were available to almost no one. For scientists who needed computers in their research, access was difficult if available at all. The effect on research was crippling. Reading publications from that time gives no hint that scientists were required to learn the arcane technical details of whatever computer facilities were available to them, a time-consuming limitation on their research, and an exceedingly tedious distraction from their professional interests.

The implementation of the Black Proposal had a primary role in shaping the computer technology of today, and its impact on research (both scientific and otherwise) has been profound. The proposal's description of the leading edge of scientific research may be sobering, and the limitations on computer usage at major universities may be surprising. A comprehensive list of the world's supercomputers shows the best resources that were then available. The thrust of the proposal may seem obvious now, but was then novel.

The National Science Foundation announced funding for the supercomputer centers in 1985; The first supercomputer at NCSA came online in January 1986.

NCSA quickly came to the attention of the worldwide scientific community with the release of NCSA Telnet in 1986. A number of other tools followed, and like NCSA Telnet, all were made available to everyone at no cost. In 1993, NCSA released the Mosaic web browser, the first popular graphical Web browser, which played an important part in expanding the growth of the World Wide Web. NCSA Mosaic was written by Marc Andreessen and Eric Bina, who went on to develop the Netscape Web browser. Mosaic was later licensed to Spyglass, Inc. which provided the foundation for Internet Explorer. The server-complement was called NCSA HTTPd, which later became known as Apache HTTP Server.

Other notable contributions by NCSA were the black hole simulations supporting the development of LIGO in 1992, the tracking of Comet Hale–Bopp in 1997, the creation of a PlayStation 2 Cluster in 2003, and the monitoring of the COVID-19 pandemic and creation of a COVID-19 vaccine.

== Facilities ==
Initially, NCSA's administrative offices were in the Water Resources Building and employees were scattered across the campus. NCSA is now headquartered within its own building directly north of the Siebel Center for Computer Science, on the site of a former baseball field, Illini Field. NCSA's supercomputers are at the National Petascale Computing Facility. The latest supercomputing system at NCSA today is the DeltaAI, funded by the National Science Foundation.

== Movies and visualization ==
NCSA's visualization department is internationally well-known. Donna Cox, leader of the Advanced Visualization Laboratory at NCSA and a professor in the School of Art and Design at the University of Illinois Urbana-Champaign, and her team created visualizations for the Oscar-nominated IMAX film "Cosmic Voyage", the PBS NOVA episodes "Hunt for the Supertwister" and "Runaway Universe", as well as Discovery Channel documentaries and pieces for CNN and NBC Nightly News. Cox and NCSA worked with the American Museum of Natural History to produce high-resolution visualizations for the Hayden Planetarium's 2000 Millennium show, "Passport to the Universe", and for "The Search for Life: Are We Alone?" She produced visualizations for the Hayden's "Big Bang Theatre" and worked with the Denver Museum of Nature and Science to produce high-resolution data-driven visualizations of terabytes of scientific data for "Black Holes: The Other Side of Infinity", a digital dome program on black holes.

== Private business partners ==
Referred to as the Industrial Partners program when it began in 1986, NCSA's collaboration with major corporations ensured that its expertise and emerging technologies would be relevant to major challenges outside of the academic world, as those challenges arose. Business partners had no control over research or the disposition of its results, but they were well-situated to be early adopters of any benefits of the research. This program is now called NCSA Industry.

Past and current business partners include:

- Abaqus
- AbbVie
- Allstate
- American Airlines
- AT&T
- Boeing Phantom Works
- Caterpillar
- Dell
- Dow Chemical
- Eastman Kodak
- Eli Lilly and Company
- ExxonMobil
- FMC Corporation
- Ford
- IBM
- Illinois Rocstar
- Innerlink
- John Deere
- JPMorgan Chase
- Kellogg's
- McDonnell Douglas (now part of Boeing)
- Motorola
- Nielsen Corporation
- Phillips Petroleum Company
- Schlumberger
- Sears
- Shell
- State Farm
- Tribune Media Company
- United Technologies

== Notable scientists ==
- Donna Cox
- Bill Gropp
- Larry Smarr
- Ed Seidel

== See also ==
- Beckman Institute for Advanced Science and Technology
- Coordinated Science Laboratory
- Cyberinfrastructure
- NCSA Brown Dog
