= Meggers =

Meggers may refer to:

== Astronomy ==
- Meggers (crater), impact crater on the far side of the Moon

== People with the surname ==
- Betty Meggers (1921–2012), American archaeologist
- George W. Meggers (1888–1969), American politician
- Joshua Meggers (born 1980), American politician and police officer
- William Frederick Meggers (1888–1966), American physicist specialising in spectroscopy

== Places ==
- Meggers, Wisconsin, unincorporated community

== Other ==
- Megger, a British electronics test equipment manufacturer
- Megohmmeter, or insulation resistance tester, a special type of ohmmeter
