= Innes (crater) =

Crater on the Moon

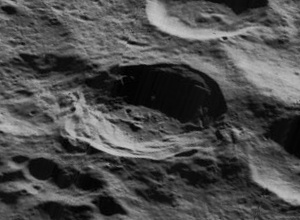
- Lunar crater Innes as seen by Lunar Orbiter 5 (facing west)
- Coordinates: 27.8°N 119.2°E
- Diameter: 42 km
- Depth: unknown
- Colongitude: 242° at sunrise
- Eponym: Robert T. A. Innes

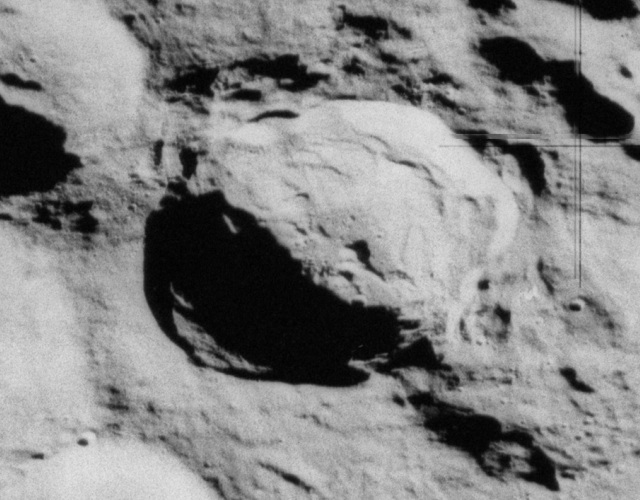
Apollo 16 mapping camera image

Innes is a lunar impact crater on the Moon's far side. It is located less than a crater diameter to the east-southeast of the prominent crater Seyfert. To the southeast of Innes is the crater Meggers, and to the west-southwest lies Polzunov.

This crater has not been significantly worn due to impact erosion, and the features remain well-defined. The shape is roughly circular with a slight outward bulge along the western edge. The inner walls have slumped somewhat, and some slight terracing has occurred. The interior floor is relatively featureless, and is marked only by a few tiny craterlets.

== Satellite craters ==
By convention these features are identified on lunar maps by placing the letter on the side of the crater midpoint that is closest to Innes.

Innes	Latitude	Longitude	Diameter
G	26.7° N	122.3° E	22 km
S	27.6° N	117.3° E	33 km
Z	29.8° N	119.2° E	33 km

== See also ==
- 1658 Innes, minor planet
