= SU Andromedae =

Star in the constellation Andromeda

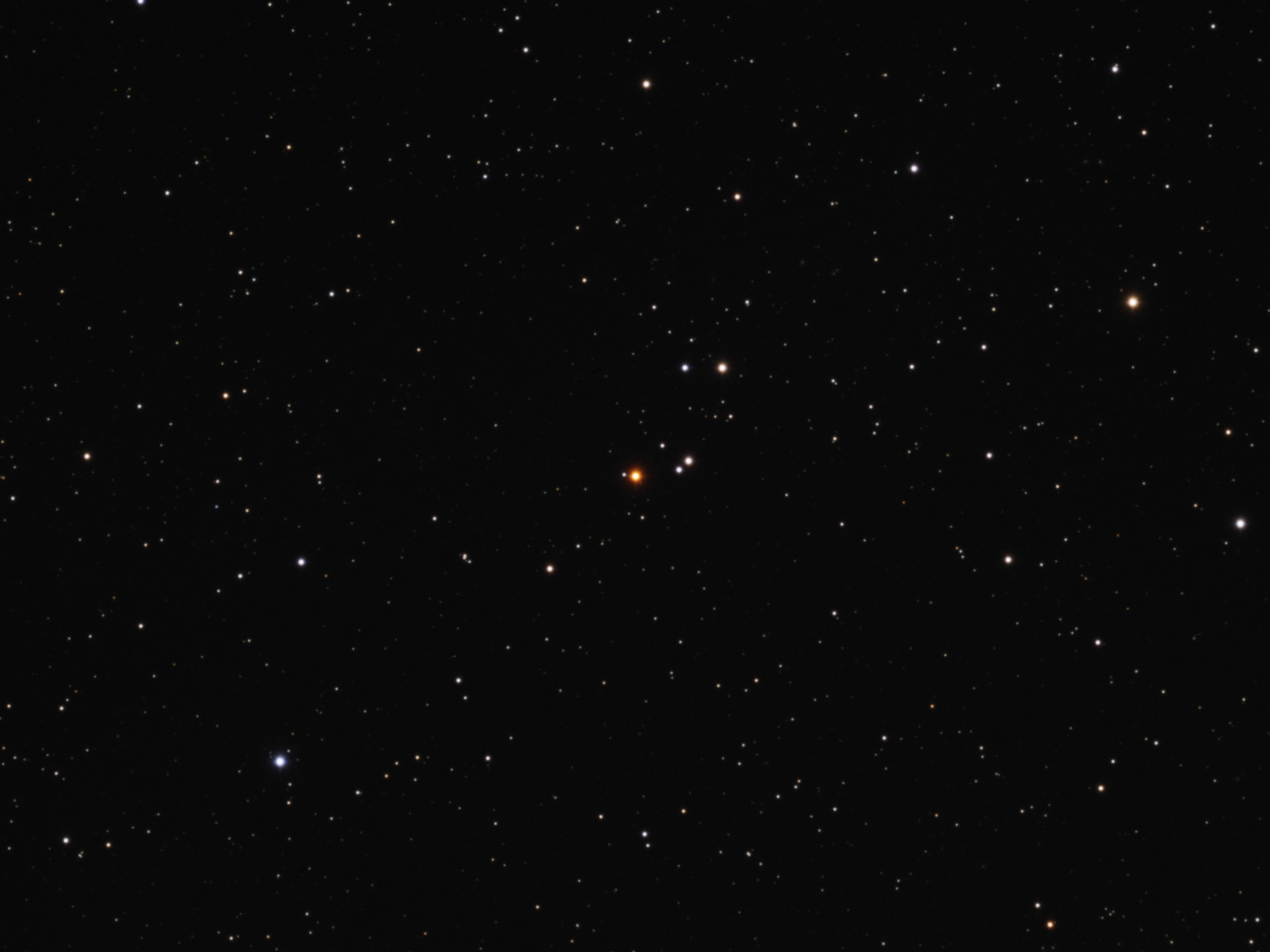
- SU Andromedae in optical light

Observation data Epoch J2000.0 Equinox ICRS
- Constellation: Andromeda
- Right ascension: 00^{h} 04^{m} 36.4076^{s}
- Declination: +43° 33′ 04.726″
- Apparent magnitude (V): 8.0 to 8.5

Characteristics
- Evolutionary stage: AGB
- Spectral type: C6,4(C5II)
- U−B color index: +4.13
- B−V color index: +2.58
- Variable type: LC

Astrometry
Proper motion (μ)	RA: −3.362±0.058 mas/yr Dec.: −2.097±0.040 mas/yr
Parallax (π)	0.6979±0.0439 mas
Distance	4,700 ± 300 ly (1,430 ± 90 pc)
Absolute magnitude (M_{V})	−2.2

Details

SU And
Luminosity	2,535 L_{☉}
Temperature	2,905 K

co-moving companion
Radius	1.95 R_{☉}
Luminosity	9.833 L_{☉}
Temperature	7,311 K

Other designations
- SU Andromedae, SU And, HD 225217, HIP 363, BD+42 4827

Database references
SIMBAD	data

SU Andromedae is a carbon star in the constellation of Andromeda. It is a variable star classified as a slow irregular pulsating supergiant, and varies from an apparent visual magnitude of 8.5 at minimum brightness to a magnitude of 8.0 at maximum brightness with no clear period.

== Variability ==
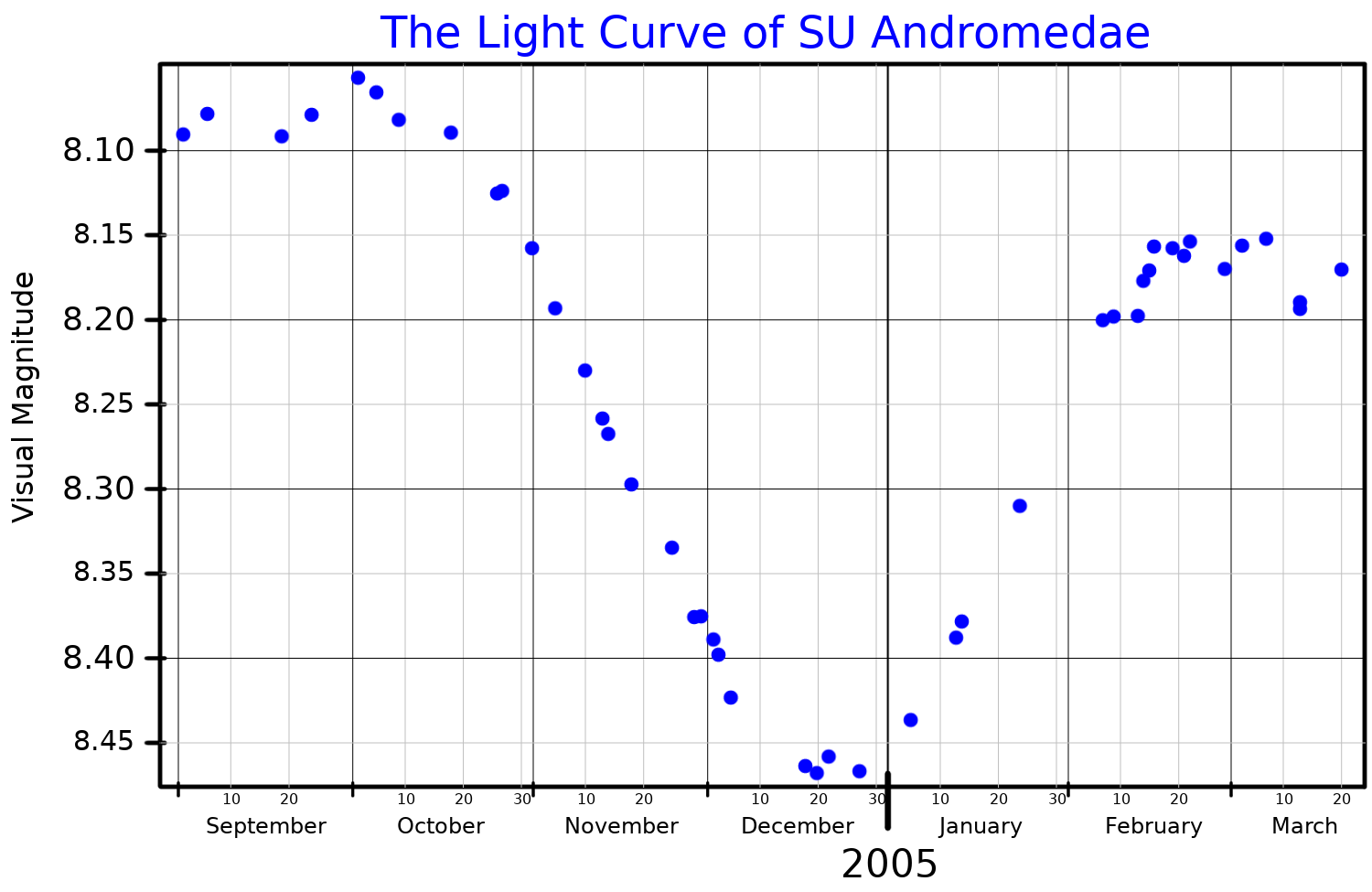
visual band light curve of SU Andromedae, adapted from Miles (2010)

Thomas Espin noted the possible variability of this star in 1895. Williamina Fleming, in 1906, was examining photographic plates taken for the purpose of creating the Henry Draper Catalogue when she independently discovered and confirmed it as a variable star.

== Spectrum ==
The spectrum of SU Andromedae is dominated by Swan bands from the molecule C_{2}. These stars were classified as type N under the Harvard scheme, stars with the blue continuum completely obscured by molecular absorption bands. Carbon star spectral types were later refined in the Morgan-Keenan system and SU Andromedae was typically classified as C6_{4}, indicating a fairly cool carbon star and the subscript 4 showing modest Swan band intensity.

Under the modern revised Morgan-Keenan system, SU Andromedae is classified as C-N5 C_{2}6-. The C-N spectral type is to distinguish those stars from the C-R type where the blue continuum is not entirely hidden by absorption bands. A classification based on the infrared spectrum is C5 II, again a moderately cool carbon star with a luminosity class of II for a bright giant.

== Companion ==
SU Andromedae is 22" from a magnitude 12.77 star, probably an F0 main sequence star. This star has a Gaia Data Release 2 parallax of 0.7479±0.0905 and an absolute magnitude of about +2.4. It has an almost identical space motion as SU Andromedae and is assumed to be a distant co-moving companion. Based on that assumption, the absolute magnitude of SU Andromedae is calculated to be about −2.2.
