= William Olcott =

William Olcott may refer to:

- William J. Olcott (1862–1935), American football player and mining and railroad executive
- William Tyler Olcott (1873–1936), American lawyer and amateur astronomer
- William M. K. Olcott (1862–1933), American lawyer and politician from New York City
