= Espin (crater) =

Crater on the Moon

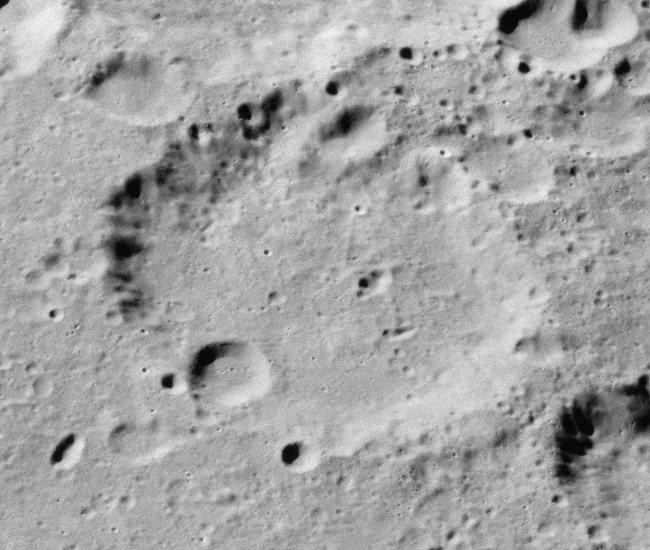
- Oblique Apollo 16 mapping camera image (facing northwest)
- Coordinates: 28.15°N 109.34°E
- Diameter: 70.01 km (43.50 mi)
- Depth: Unknown
- Colongitude: 251° at sunrise
- Eponym: Thomas H. E. C. Espin

Espin is a degraded lunar impact crater that lies on the far side of the Moon, just beyond the northeastern limb. It is located to the west-southwest of the larger crater Seyfert, and northwest of Deutsch.

This is a worn formation with heavy damage along the northern rim. Several small craters lie along the northern edge, and a crater lies across the southern rim. The northern part of the interior floor is somewhat irregular, but it is more level to the south. A ray from the crater Giordano Bruno to the north-northwest reaches the western interior of Espin.

This crater is named after Thomas Henry Espinell Compton Espin, an amateur astronomer who was a vicar of Tow Law. Prior to formal naming in 1970 by the IAU, Espin was known as Crater 117.

== Satellite craters ==
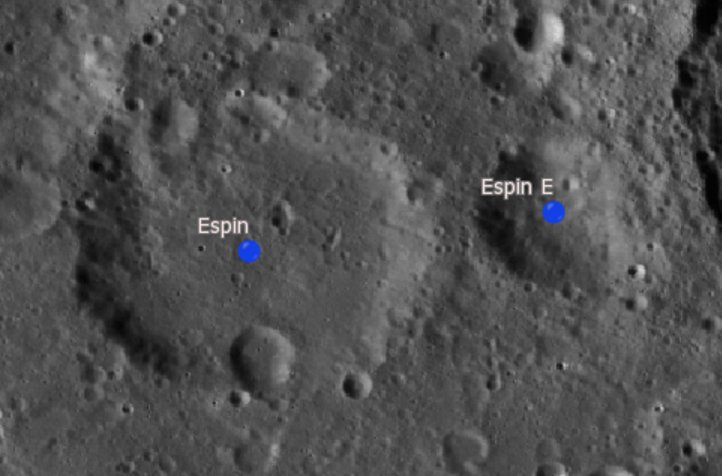
Satellite crater of Espin

By convention these features are identified on lunar maps by placing the letter on the side of the crater midpoint that is closest to Espin.

Espin	Latitude	Longitude	Diameter
E	28.3° N	111.3° E	35 km
