= Meggers (crater) =

Crater on the Moon

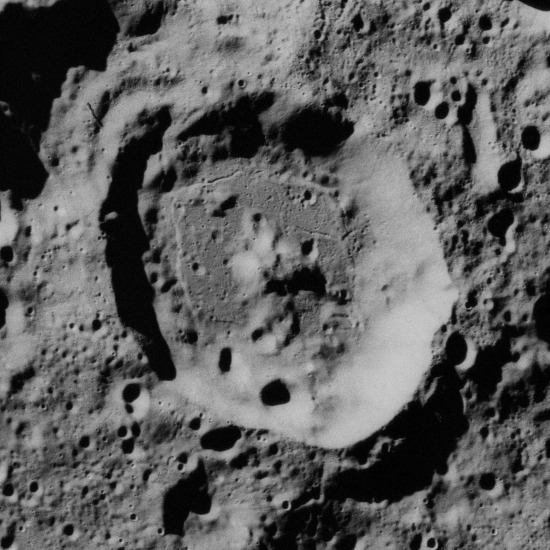
- Oblique Apollo 16 mapping camera image
- Coordinates: 24.3°N 123.0°E
- Diameter: 52 km
- Colongitude: 237° at sunrise
- Eponym: William F. Meggers

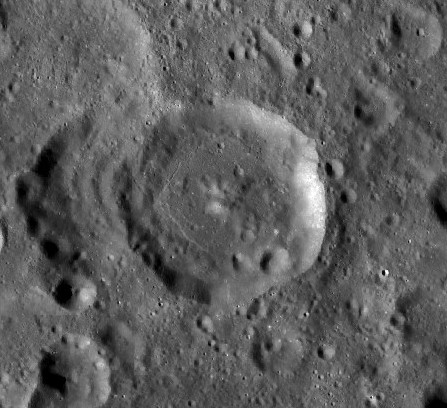
LRO image

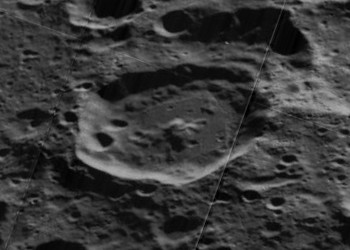
Oblique Lunar Orbiter 5 image, facing west (black lines are artifacts of image reprocessing)

Meggers is an impact crater that lies on the far side of the Moon. It was named after American physicist William F. Meggers.

The rim of Meggers is roughly circular in form, with slight outward bulges to the southeast and northeast. The crater merges with a comparably sized formation to the northwest, and the intervening rim is somewhat irregular in form. The interior floor of Meggers is slightly irregular.

Nearby craters of note include Olcott to the southwest, Innes, and Seyfert farther away to the northwest. To the east lies Vernadskiy. To the west is the crater Meggers S, a formation almost as large as Meggers itself. It has a rough interior and a tiny crater lies across the southern rim.

== Satellite craters ==
By convention these features are identified on lunar maps by placing the letter on the side of the crater midpoint that is closest to Meggers.

Meggers	Latitude	Longitude	Diameter
S	24.0° N	119.8° E	39 km
