= Robert T. A. Innes =

South African astronomer (1861–1933)

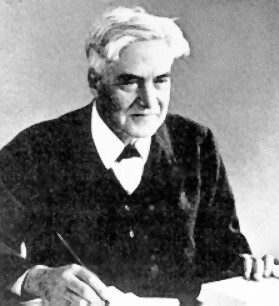

Robert Thorburn Ayton Innes FRSE FRAS (10 November 1861 – 13 March 1933) was a British-born South African astronomer best known for discovering Proxima Centauri in 1915, and numerous binary stars. He was also the first astronomer to have seen the Great January Comet of 1910, on 12 January. He was the founding director of a meteorological observatory in Johannesburg, which was later converted to an astronomical observatory and renamed to Union Observatory. He was the first Union Astronomer. Innes House, designed by Herbert Baker, built as his residence at the observatory, today houses the South African Institute of Electrical Engineers.

== Biography ==
He was born on 10 November 1861 in Edinburgh to John and Elizabeth (née Ayton) Innes. He had 11 younger siblings.

A self-taught astronomer, he went to Australia at an early age and made his living as a wine merchant in Sydney, where, using a home made 12-inch reflecting telescope, he discovered several double stars new to astronomy. Innes published a double star catalog in 1900 that assimilated all earlier observations by southern astronomers, to provide the longest baseline for orbit determination. He published another in 1927. His catalogs were in turn incorporated into later catalogs of all known double stars. He also published some papers on perturbations in Mars's and Venus's orbits.

Despite having had no formal training in astronomy, he was invited to the Royal Observatory, Cape of Good Hope by the HM Astronomer Sir David Gill in 1894 and appointed in 1896. While at the Cape, he discovered what is now known as Kapteyn's Star which the latter had listed as one of a number included in the Cordoba Durchmusterung but missing from the later Cape Photographic Durchmusterung. Innes found what had happened to it: it has a very large proper motion and had moved considerably during the intervening time interval.

In 1903 he took up the position of Director of the new Transvaal Meteorological Observatory in Johannesburg, which became the Transvaal Observatory in 1906. He acquired the observatory's first telescope, a 9-inch Grubb refractor, in 1909, and was appointed first Union Astronomer in 1912 at the establishment of the Union Observatory. The prime telescope from 1925 onwards was a 26.5-inch refractor, ideal for Innes's continued study of faint visual binary stars.

John Franklin-Adams, a pioneer of astrophotography, presented his 10-inch astrographic camera to the Union Observatory, which Innes used in the discovery of Proxima Centauri. In 1915, he found a faint star fairly close to and sharing the same large proper motion with Alpha Centauri, which until then was believed to be the closest star system to the Sun. Innes believed, on rather slim evidence, that it was closer than Alpha and in 1917 named it Proxima. He was not able to measure its distance accurately with his 9-inch refractor or the short focus Franklin-Adams astrograph. The definitive distance was measured by Harold Lee Alden at the Yale observatory station in Johannesburg which was equipped with a long focus camera designed for stellar parallax work. Alden's more precise measurements confirmed Proxima to be the closest star to the sun. No closer star has been found to date.

Visual double star observation was Innes's main contribution to astronomy. When he started observing them as an amateur in Australia, the choice plums had already been picked by earlier astronomers, notably James Dunlop and John Herschel. Many of Innes's discoveries were stars with faint companions that were missed by earlier observers. Most of his labor was the measurement of the relative positions of binary pairs with a filar micrometer. All known doubles were periodically re-measured to determine their orbits. With Thiele, Innes formulated a simplified method of specifying double star orbits. These orbital parameters when combined with other measurements, such as radial velocity allow the mass of each star of the binary pair to be determined. Mass, combined with luminosity and temperature or spectral type, is a fundamental parameter needed in theories of stellar structure and stellar evolution.

The University of Leyden awarded Innes an honoris causa doctorate in 1923. He retired in 1927. Innes was a first-rank chess player. He died suddenly on 13 March 1933 in England while pursuing a 3D cinema idea: He had amused observatory guests with a stereo cinema viewer, and probably had in mind combining its principle with that of a blink comparator, which he used in finding stars of high proper motion, to make a screen 3D projector.

== Legacy ==
Innes tirelessly campaigned for foreign investment in South Africa's astronomy infrastructure; he believed that its clear skies were ideally suited for astronomical observation. He discovered some 1600 new pairs of double stars, had a great interest in stellar proper motions, and devoted much time to the study of Jupiter's satellites.

Once erroneously believed to be one of the closest stars to Earth, Innes' star, which Innes discovered, bears his name.

== Honors ==
The following features have been named after him:

- The lunar crater Innes.
- The asteroid 1658 Innes.
