= A Subway Named Mobius =

1950 short story by Armin Joseph Deutsch

"A Subway Named Mobius" is a 1950 science fiction short story by American astronomer Armin Joseph Deutsch. Originally published in Astounding Science Fiction, it imagines the results of increasing the complexity of the Boston MTA system (now the MBTA) with a new interconnection. It has been collected in anthologies since its original publication, and was nominated for a Retro Hugo Award in 2001, placing fourth in the final vote.

== Plot ==
Shortly after the opening of a new track known as the Boylston Shuttle, Boston MTA train No. 86 goes missing. Whyte, the manager of the system, cannot explain its disappearance nor account for the fact that the system acts as though it was still there, drawing power and causing signals to operate automatically, sometimes miles apart.

It falls to mathematician Professor Roger Tupelo of Harvard to attempt an explanation. Though not a topologist himself, he believes that the new shuttle connection caused the topological complexity of the system to increase to the point where the connectivity became infinite. The train is now running in an extra dimension of space and time. Unfortunately the one mathematician who might understand the problem, Prof. Turnbull of MIT, cannot be located and was almost certainly on the train when it vanished.

Attempts to find the train are futile. Tupelo warns that closing the new shuttle will prevent the train from ever reappearing. Ten weeks pass by. Famous topologists are brought in to analyze the problem, but only manage to disagree with each other. The city prepares to defend multiple lawsuits and deal with investigations by the Federal government.

One day, after cautiously resuming using the MTA himself, Tupelo realizes he is on the missing train and that no time has passed for the passengers. Stopping the train in a tunnel, he tells the driver to get him to a phone so he can contact Whyte. However it is too late. Another train has already vanished.

== Publication history ==
"A Subway Named Mobius" first appeared in Astounding Science Fiction in December 1950. It was first anthologized in 1952, and was republished as "Non-Stop" in Argosy in the UK in 1953. In 2001 it was nominated for a Retro Hugo Award, placing 4th.

== Topology ==
The story's title refers to the Möbius strip, and the story also mentions a Klein bottle.

== Adaptations ==
The story was the basis of the 1996 Argentine film Moebius, with the setting changed to Buenos Aires.
