= Deutsch (crater) =

Crater on the Moon

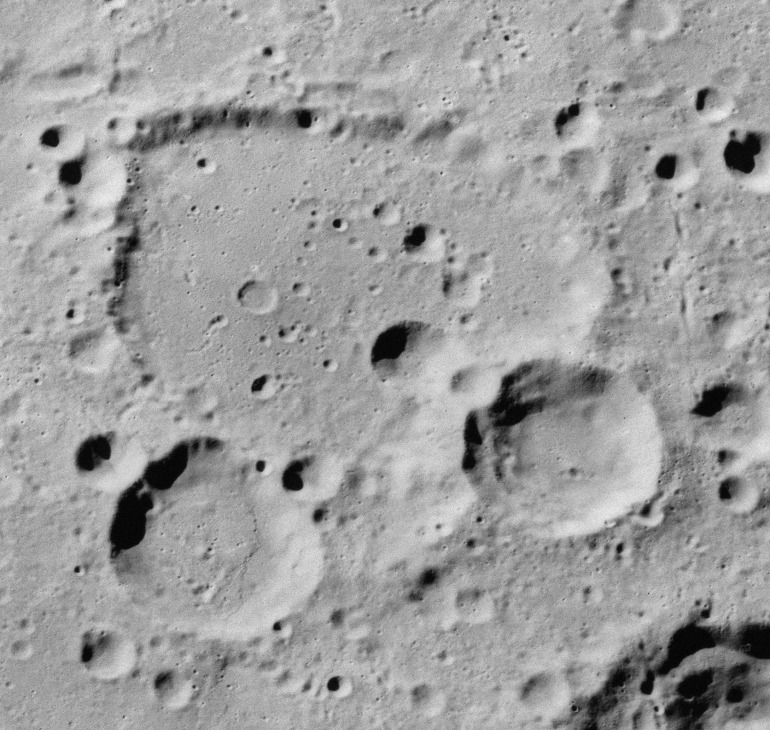
- Oblique Apollo 16 mapping camera image (facing northwest)
- Coordinates: 24.1°N 110.5°E
- Diameter: 24.35 km (15.13 mi)
- Depth: Unknown
- Colongitude: 250° at sunrise
- Eponym: Armin J. Deutsch

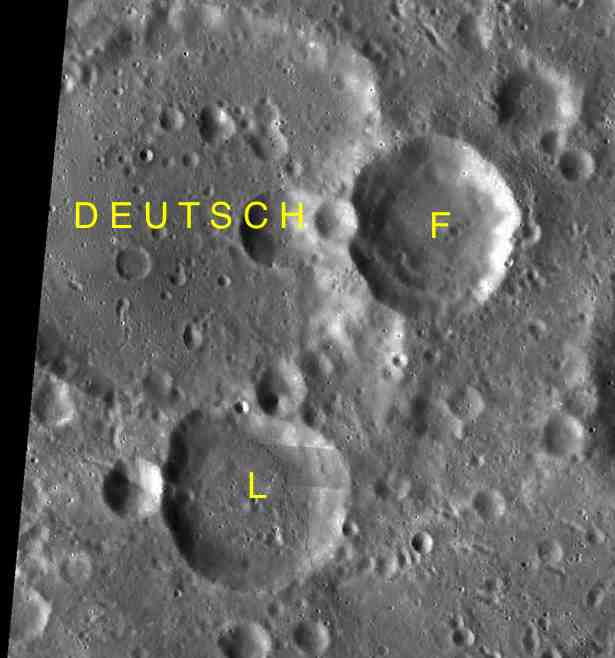
Satellite features

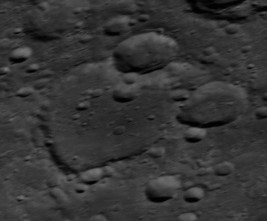
Oblique Apollo 14 Hasselblad camera image (facing east)

Deutsch is a lunar impact crater on the far side of the Moon. It lies to the southwest of the larger crater Seyfert. About one crater to the east-northeast is Polzunov.

This crater has a relatively low, eroded rim that is heavily damaged along the southeastern section. This portion is overlain by Deutsch F along the east and Deutsch L to the south, with an irregular region between these two formations. The interior floor of Deutsch is relatively level, but is marked by a number of small impacts. A ray from Giordano Bruno to the north-northwest passes along the western edge of Deutsch.

This crater is named after Armin Joseph Deutsch (1918–1969), an American astronomer and science-fiction author. Its designation was officially adopted by the International Astronomical Union in 1970.

== Satellite craters ==
By convention these features are identified on lunar maps by placing the letter on the side of the crater midpoint that is closest to Deutsch.

Deutsch	Latitude	Longitude	Diameter
F	24.1° N	112.0° E	31 km
L	22.4° N	110.8° E	36 km
