= DI Lacertae =

1910 Nova in the constellation Lacerta

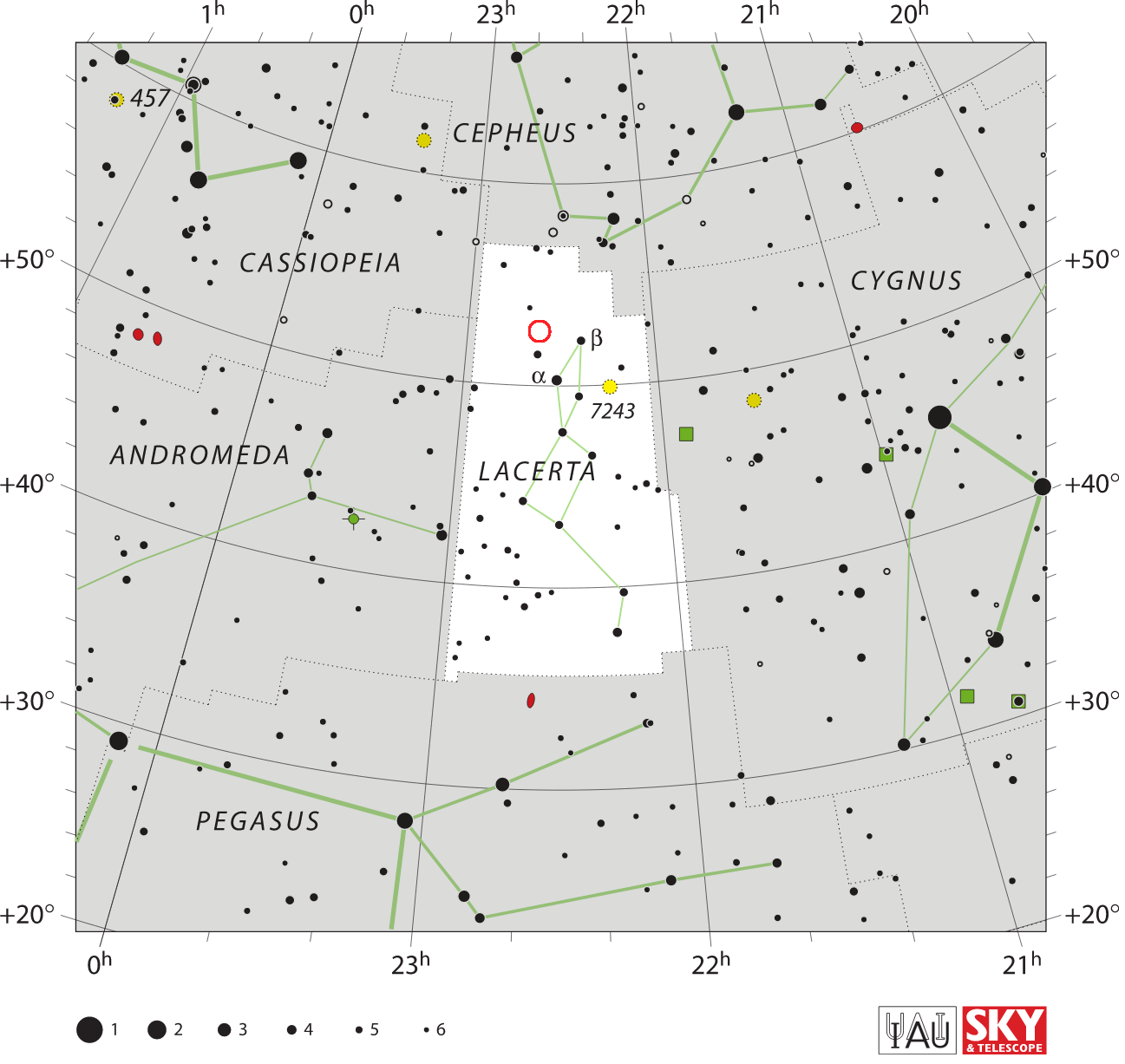
- Location of DI Lacertae (circled in red)

Observation data Epoch J2000.0 Equinox ICRS
- Constellation: Lacerta
- Right ascension: 22^{h} 35^{m} 48.495^{s}
- Declination: 52° 42′ 59.64″
- Apparent magnitude (V): 4.6v – 14.9p

Characteristics
- Variable type: Nova

Astrometry
Proper motion (μ)	RA: −1.794 mas/yr Dec.: −2.362 mas/yr
Parallax (π)	0.5783±0.0173 mas
Distance	5,600 ± 200 ly (1,730 ± 50 pc)
Absolute magnitude (M_{V})	−7.2 – +3.8

Details

White dwarf
Mass	0.91 M_{☉}

Other designations
- Nova Lac 1910, DI Lac, HD 214239, AAVSO 2231+52

Database references
SIMBAD	data

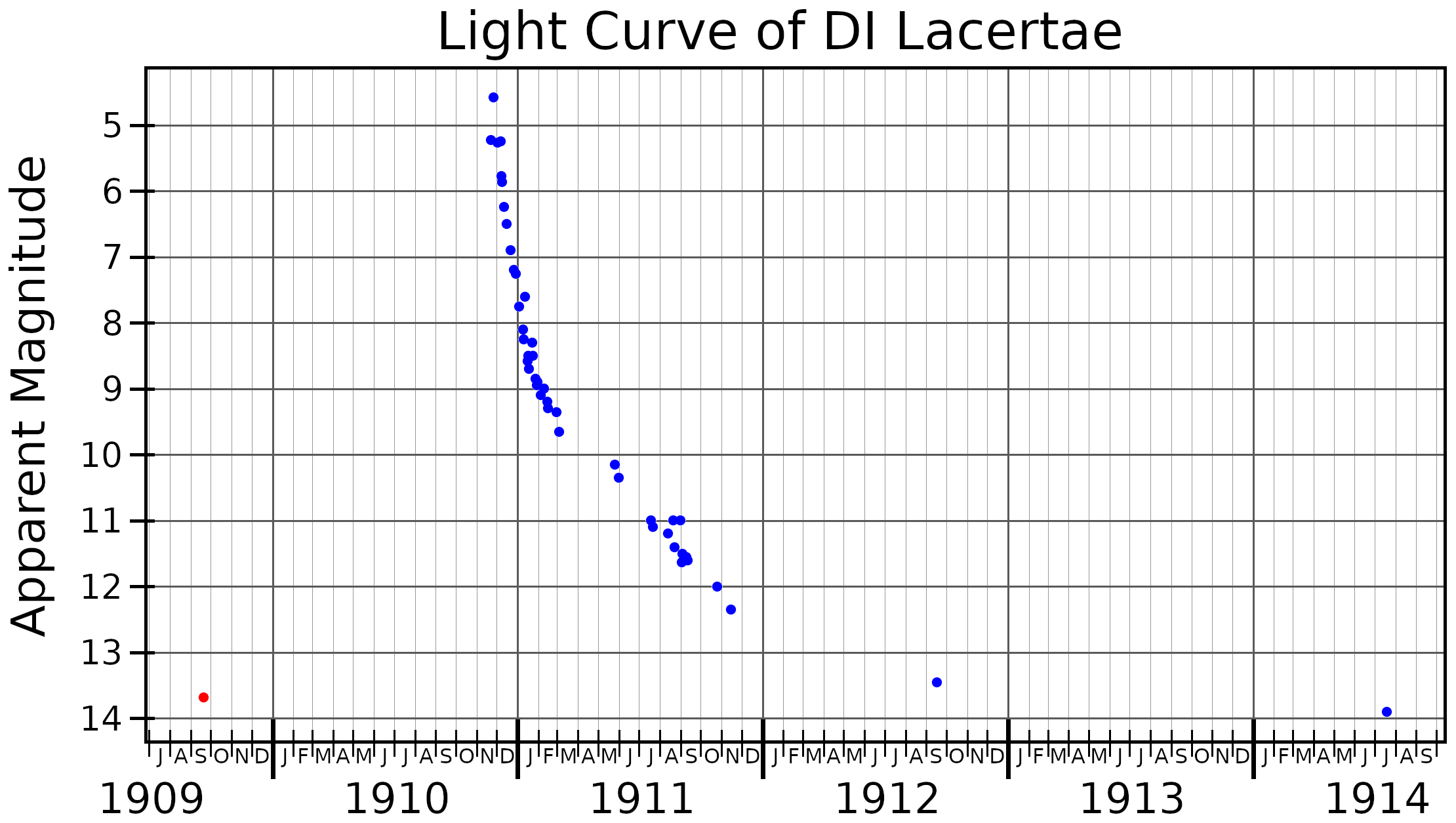
The light curve of nova DI Lacertae, plotted from data presented by Shapley. If multiple measurements with identical times were reported, they were averaged before plotting The red pre-eruption point is from Robinson.

DI Lacertae or Nova Lacertae 1910 was a nova in constellation Lacerta which appeared in 1910. It was discovered by Thomas Henry Espinell Compton Espin at Wolsingham Observatory on 30 Dec 1910, at which time it was an 8th magnitude object. Subsequent examination of pre-discovery photographic plates showed that the outburst occurred sometime between 17 November 1910 and 23 November 1910. It reached a peak brightness of magnitude 4.6 on 26 November 1910, making it visible to the naked eye. Before the nova event DI Lacertae was a 14th magnitude star, and by 1950 it had returned to 14th magnitude.

DI Lacertae dropped from peak brightness by 3 magnitudes in just 43 days, making it a "fast nova".

All novae are binary stars, with a "donor" star orbiting a white dwarf. The two stars are so close to each other that matter is transferred from the donor star to the white dwarf. In the case of DI Lacertae, the orbital period for the binary pair is 13.050 hours, which is unusually long for a nova. The mass of the white dwarf has been estimated to be 0.91±0.2M_{☉} In 2017 Sion et al. presented analysis of ultraviolet spectra from the Far Ultraviolet Spectroscopic Explorer and International Ultraviolet Explorer spacecraft, and found the best fit for DI Lacertae to be an accretion disk with a mass accretion rate of 10^{−10}M_{☉} per year with a 30,000 Kelvin white dwarf. Darnley et al. argue that the donor star is probably a main sequence star or, less probably, a subdwarf.
