= Olcott (crater) =

Crater on the Moon

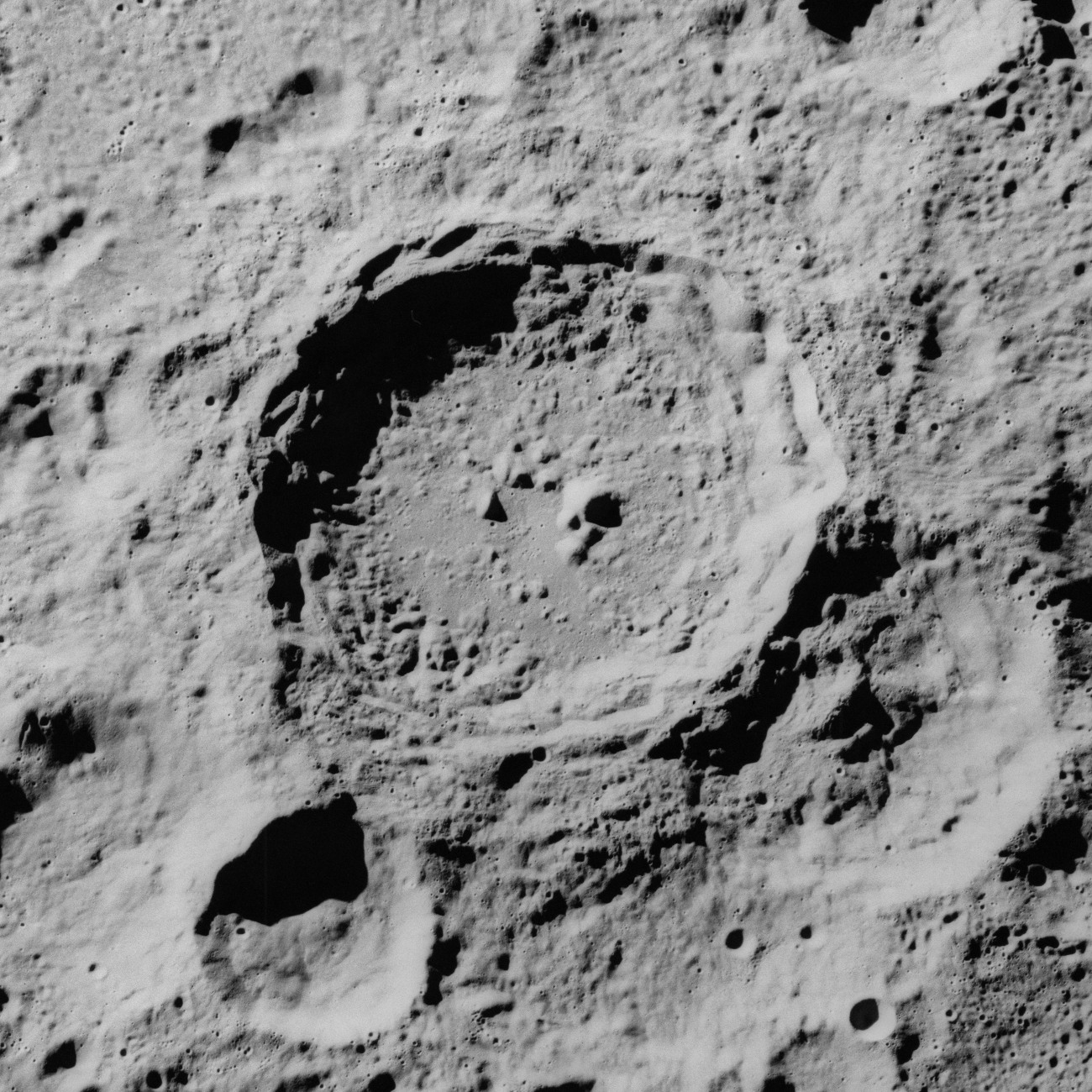
- Oblique Apollo 16 image, facing northwest
- Coordinates: 20.6°N 117.8°E
- Diameter: 81 km
- Colongitude: 243° at sunrise
- Eponym: William T. Olcott

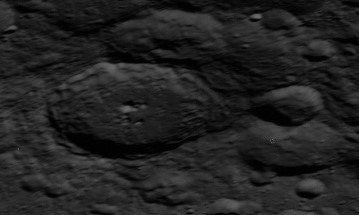
Oblique Apollo 14 image, facing east. Olcott is left of center, Olcott E and M on right

Olcott is a relatively fresh crater on the far side of the Moon. It was named after American astronomer William Tyler Olcott. It lies to the south-southeast of the craters Seyfert and Polzunov, and to the north of Kostinskiy.

This formation dates to the Eratosthenian epoch of the lunar geologic timescale. It lacks any significant appearance of erosion from subsequent impacts, and its features are relatively well-defined. The rim edge is generally circular, with a slight outward bulge to the northeast and a larger bulge to the south. It has an outer rampart and some terraces and slumped edges along the inner wall.

Several low ridges lie near the interior midpoint, with the western pair near the center and the eastern peaks offset towards the eastern rim. The infrared spectrum of pure crystalline plagioclase has been identified on the central rises.

The satellite craters Olcott M and Olcott L form an overlapping pair along the southern outer rampart of Olcott, with the smaller member of the pair Olcott L overlapping Olcott M. The satellite crater Olcott E is partly overlain by the eastern rim of Olcott.

Prior to naming in 1970 by the IAU, this crater was known as Crater 209.

== Satellite craters ==
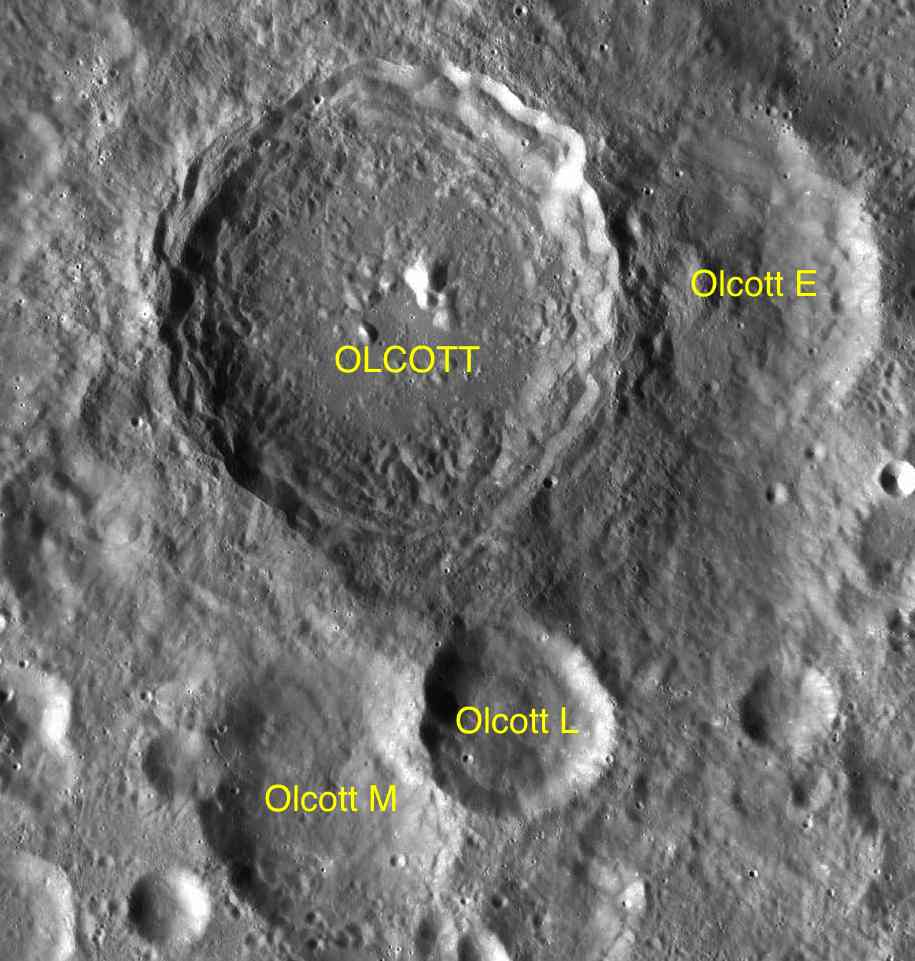
Olcott and its satellite craters

By convention these features are identified on lunar maps by placing the letter on the side of the crater midpoint that is closest to Olcott.

Olcott	Latitude	Longitude	Diameter
E	20.9° N	119.8° E	59 km
L	18.3° N	118.6° E	36 km
M	17.9° N	117.6° E	46 km
