= 1658 Innes =

Main-belt asteroid

Discovery
- Discovered by: J. A. Bruwer
- Discovery site: Johannesburg Obs.
- Discovery date: 13 July 1953

Designations
- Named after: Robert T. A. Innes (astronomer)
- Alternative designations: 1953 NA · 1940 GB; 1948 EM · 1949 QA; 1953 OF · 1953 PN; 1957 OE
- Minor planet category: main-belt · (middle)

Orbital characteristics
- Epoch 4 September 2017 (JD 2458000.5)
- Uncertainty parameter 0
- Observation arc: 77.08 yr (28,155 days)
- Aphelion: 3.0302 AU
- Perihelion: 2.0866 AU
- Semi-major axis: 2.5584 AU
- Eccentricity: 0.1844
- Orbital period (sidereal): 4.09 yr (1,495 days)
- Mean anomaly: 247.27°
- Mean motion: 0° 14^{m} 27.24^{s} / day
- Inclination: 9.0941°
- Longitude of ascending node: 95.441°
- Argument of perihelion: 188.76°

Physical characteristics
- Dimensions: 13.352±0.140 km 13.54±1.17 km 14.082±0.042 km 14.76 km (calculated)
- Synodic rotation period: 3.191±0.001 h
- Geometric albedo: 0.20 (assumed); 0.2241±0.0369; 0.248±0.019; 0.626±0.318
- Spectral type: B–V = 0.960; U–B = 0.610; Tholen = AS · AS
- Absolute magnitude (H): 11.27±0.41 · 10.47 · 11.52

1658 Innes, provisional designation 1953 NA, is a rare-type asteroid from the middle region of the asteroid belt, approximately 15 kilometers in diameter. It was named after Robert T. A. Innes.

== Discovery ==
Innes was discovered on 13 July 1953, by South African astronomer Jacobus Bruwer at Johannesburg Observatory in South Africa.

It was the first numbered discovery of astronomer Jacobus Bruwer. In addition, he also discovered the minor planets 1660 Wood, 1794 Finsen, and 3284 Niebuhr. The asteroid 1811 Bruwer was named in his honour by the Dutch, Dutch-American astronomer trio of the Palomar–Leiden survey.

== Orbit and classification ==
It orbits the Sun in the central main-belt at a distance of 2.1–3.0 AU once every 4 years and 1 month (1,495 days). Its orbit has an eccentricity of 0.18 and an inclination of 9° with respect to the ecliptic. Innes was first identified as 1940 GB at Turku Observatory in 1940, extending the body's observation arc by 13 years prior to its official discovery observation.

== Physical characteristics ==
In the Tholen taxonomy, Innes has an AS-spectral type, an intermediate form of the rare A-types to the common stony asteroids (also see category listing).

=== Rotation period ===
In May 2005, astronomers Robert Stephens at the Center for Solar System Studies, California, and Lorenzo Franco at Balzaretto Observatory, near Rome, each obtained a rotational lightcurve of Innes. The photometric observations gave an identical rotation period of 3.191±0.001 hours with a brightness variation of 0.22 and 0.25 magnitude, respectively (U=3/3).

=== Diameter and albedo ===
According to the 2014-revised survey result of NASA's Wide-field Infrared Survey Explorer with its subsequent NEOWISE mission, Innes measures 13.35 kilometers in diameter and its surface has an albedo of 0.248, while the Collaborative Asteroid Lightcurve Link assumes a standard albedo for stony asteroids of 0.20 and calculates a diameter of 14.76 kilometers with an absolute magnitude of 11.52.

== Naming ==
This minor planet was named for Scottish–South African astronomer Robert T. A. Innes (1861–1933), first director of the discovering Union Observatory from 1903 to 1927 (originally named Transvaal Observatory). He was a skilled observational astronomer, famous for his deliberate search for and discovery of the nearest star, Proxima Centauri, in 1915. He also made important theoretical and computational contributions to celestial mechanics and to the irregular rotation of the Earth. The astronomer is also honored by the lunar crater Innes. The official naming citation was published by the Minor Planet Center on 1 July 1972 (M.P.C. 3297).
