= Möbius resistor =

Electrical component

Current in a Möbius resistor

A Möbius resistor is an electrical component made up of two conductive surfaces separated by a dielectric material, twisted 180° and connected to form a Möbius strip. As with the Möbius strip, once the Möbius resistor is connected up in this way, it effectively has only one side and one continuous surface. Its connectors are attached at the same point on the circumference but on opposite surfaces. It provides a resistor with a reduced self-inductance, meaning that it can resist the flow of electricity in a more frequency-independent manner.

== Transmission line ==
Due to a symmetrical construction, the voltage between the conductive surfaces of the Möbius resistor at the point equidistant to the feed point is exactly zero. This means that a short circuit placed at this point doesn't influence the characteristics of the device. Thus, the Möbius resistor can be thought of as two shorted lossy (resistive) transmission line segments, connected in parallel at the resistor's feed point.

== Patents ==
- U.S. patent 4,599,586, Möbius capacitor
- U.S. patent 3,267,406, Non-inductive electrical resistor
- U.S. patent 6,611,412, Apparatus and method for minimizing electromagnetic emissions of technical emitters, Dietrich Reichwein

== See also ==
- Ayrton–Perry winding
