= William Tyler Olcott =

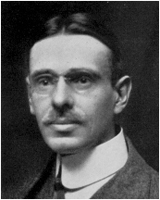
- William Tyler Olcott
- Born: January 11, 1873; Norwich, Connecticut
- Died: July 6, 1936 (aged 63); New Hampshire
- Spouse: Clara Hyde

William Tyler Olcott (January 11, 1873–July 6, 1936) was an American lawyer and amateur astronomer.

Olcott was born in Norwich, Connecticut, to William Marvin Olcott and E. Octavia Tyler, and was educated at Trinity College at Hartford, then attended law school in New York. Although admitted to the bar in New York and Connecticut, he never practiced law. In 1902, he was married to Clara Hyde. During 1905 while vacationing in Rhode Island, a friend of Clara introduced him to the stars and constellations. He was instantly enthralled, and two years later had published his first book, A Field Book of the Stars. In 1909, after attending a lecture by Edward Charles Pickering, he developed an interest in observing variable stars. In 1911, he co-founded the American Association of Variable Star Observers (AAVSO). Olcott also wrote six books to popularize the field of amateur astronomy.

== Awards and honors ==
- AAVSO Merit Award (1936)
- The William Tyler Olcott Award of the AAVSO, initiated in 2000, is named for him.
- The crater Olcott on the Moon is named after him.

== Bibliography ==
Books

- W. T. Olcott, A Field Book of the Stars, 1907, New York, G. P. Putnam’s Sons
- W. T. Olcott, In Starland With A Three-Inch Telescope, 1909, New York, G. P. Putnam's Sons
- W. T. Olcott, Star Lore of All Ages, 1911, New York, G. P. Putnam's Sons
- W. T. Olcott, Sun Lore of All Ages, 1914, New York, G. P. Putnam’s Sons
- W. T. Olcott, The Book of the Stars For Young People, 1923, New York, G. P. Putnam’s Sons
- W. T. Olcott & Edmund W. Putnam, Field Book of the Skies, 1929, New York, G. P. Putnam's Sons

Articles

- W. T. Olcott, "Variable Star Work for the Amateur Astronomer," 1911, Popular Astronomy
