= William Frederick Meggers =

American physicist (1888–1966)

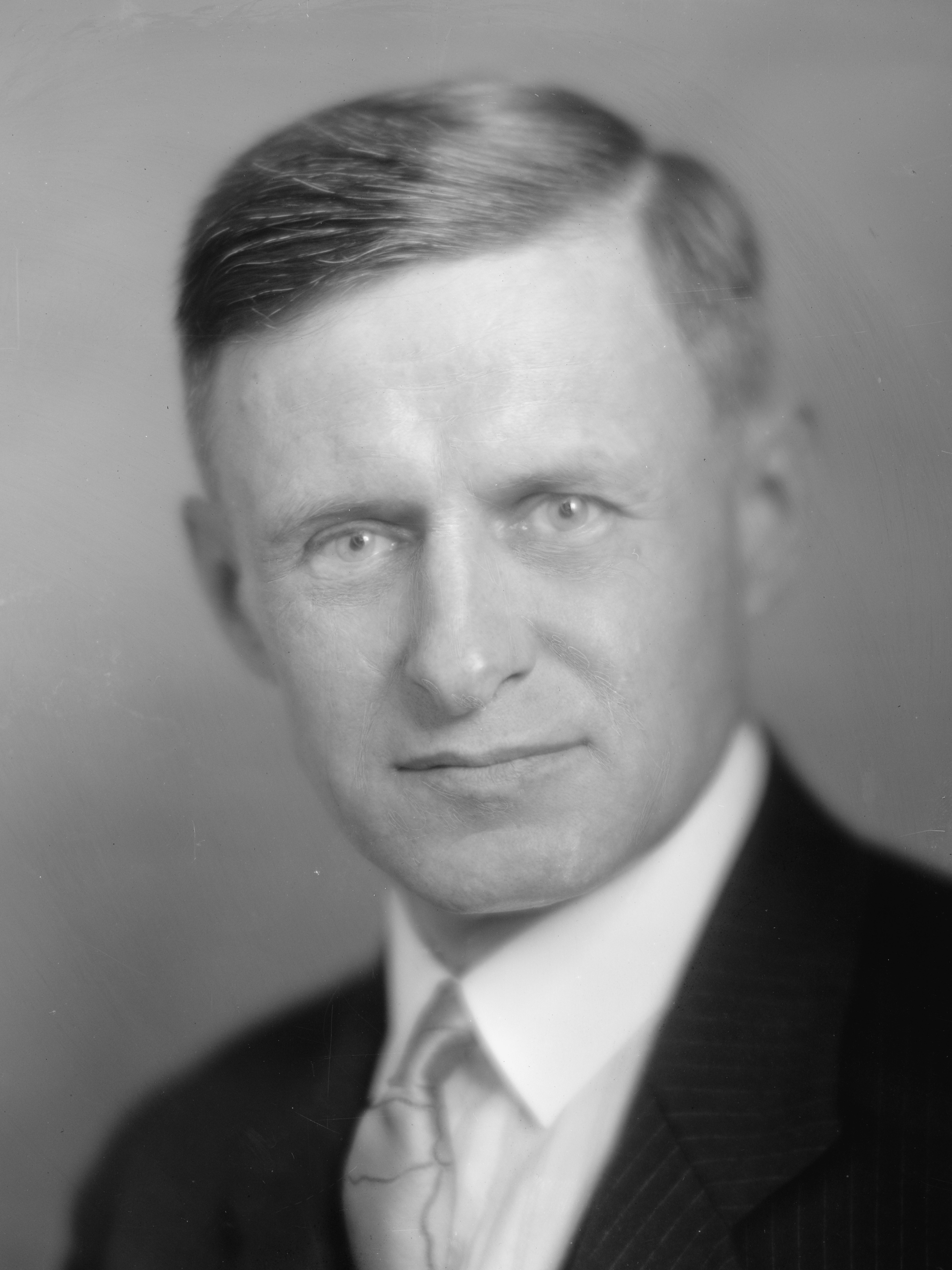
- Born: June 13, 1888; Clintonville, Wisconsin, United States
- Died: November 19, 1966 (aged 78)
- Education: Ripon College (Wisconsin) (BA); Johns Hopkins University (PhD)
- Known for: Laporte rule
- Children: 3, including Betty Meggers
- Scientific career
- Workplaces: NIST

William Frederick Meggers (July 13, 1888 – November 19, 1966) was an American physicist specialising in spectroscopy. His work in spectrochemistry is generally credited to have sparked interest in the field in the United States, leading to him being dubbed the Dean of American spectroscopists.

== Life ==
Born in Clintonville, Wisconsin, he had to combine his early schooling with working on the family farm, but earned a scholarship to Ripon College, receiving a bachelor's degree in physics in 1910 and working as a research assistant. After a few years at the Carnegie Institute of Technology (now Carnegie Mellon University) in Pittsburgh, Pennsylvania, in 1914 he joined the National Bureau of Standards, and while working there earned his PhD from Johns Hopkins University.

In 1925, Meggers and Otto Laporte first introduced the concept of parity in spectroscopic measurements, this phenomenon is now known as Laporte rule.

In 1965, Dr. Meggers and his wife, Edith R. Meggers, donated their coin and stamp collections to the American Institute of Physics, for the express purpose of establishing a biennial award program for the improvement of physics teaching at the high school level. Awards have been presented since 1994.

== Family ==
He had three children. His daughter and oldest child was Betty Meggers, who also received her doctorate and became a noted archeologist at the Smithsonian Institution in Washington, DC, specializing in South American pre-Columbian archeology.

== Honors and awards ==
In 1947 he received the Frederic Ives Medal and the C.E.K. Mees Medal in 1964, both from the Optical Society. In 1958, OSA named him an Honorary Member. He was awarded the Elliott Cresson Medal in 1953.

There are two awards named in his honor: The Optical Society's William F. Meggers Award (since 1970) and the Applied Spectroscopy William F. Meggers Award.

The Meggers crater on the Moon is named in his honor.
