= Ring Van Möbius =

Norwegian rock band

- Origin: Kopervik, Norway
- Genres: Prog Rock
- Years active: 2017--present
- Label: Apollon Records

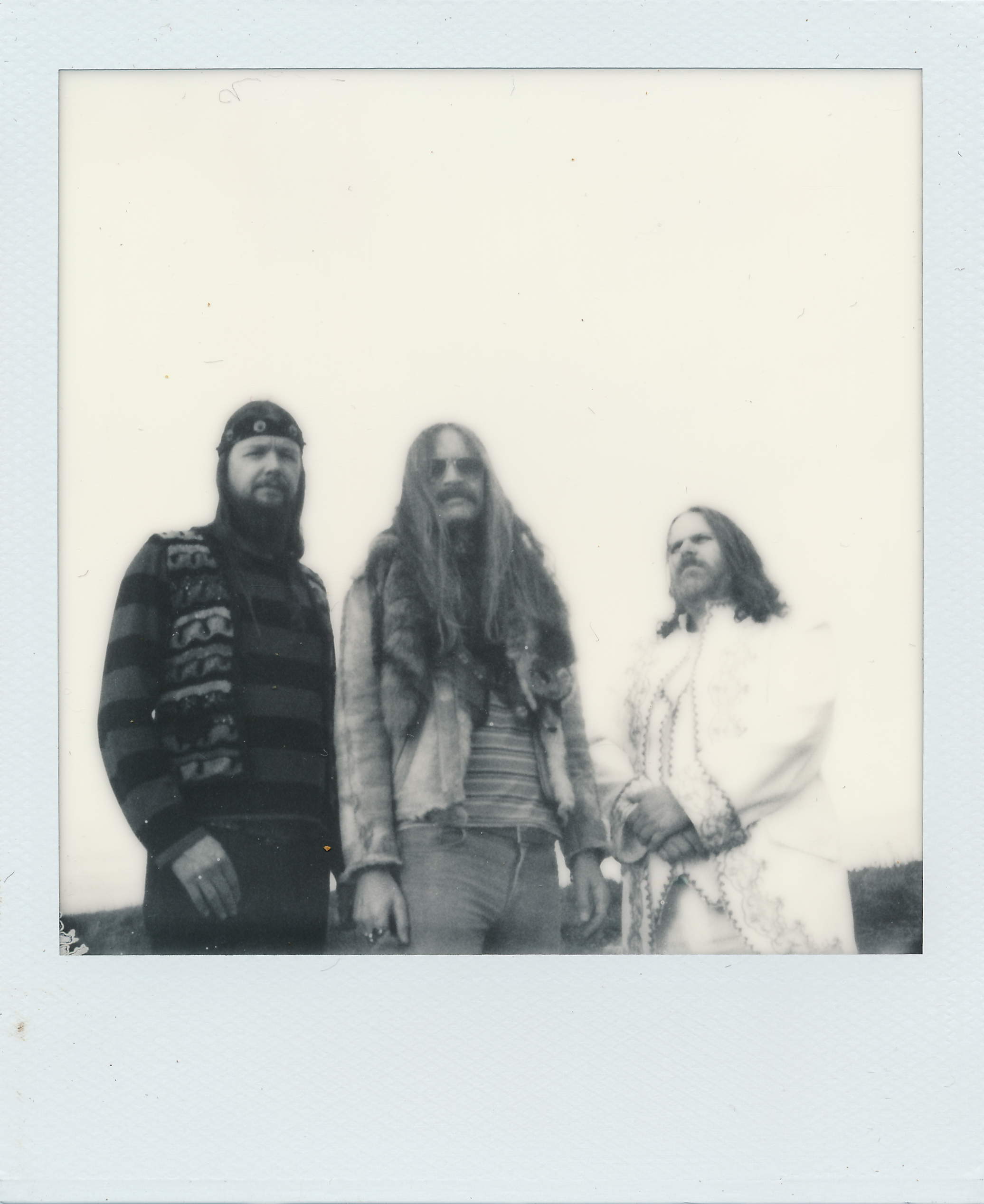

Ring Van Möbius is a Norwegian rock band currently based in Kopervik, Norway.

The band styles itself as "Retro Prog", evoking the sounds of bands like ELP, Van Der Graaf Generator and Jethro Tull from the 1970s.

== History ==
Ring Van Möbius was formed in 2017.

The band started playing live in 2018 and have released two full LP's on Apollon Records to date, garnering significant international press.

== Members ==
=== Current members ===
- Thor Erik Helgesen : Vocals, Hammond L100, Spectral Modular Synthesis System, Fender Rhodes, Clavinet D6, piano, Moog Satellite, Korg MS20
- Håvard Rasmussen : Fender Bass VI, Moog Theremin, Ring Modulator and Space Echo effects
- Dag Olav Husås : Glockenspiel, chimes, timpani, gong, tubular bells, cymbals, drums and backing vocals

== Discography ==
=== Albums ===
- Past the Evening Sun (2018)
- The 3rd Majesty (2020)
- Commissioned Works Pt II - Six Drops of Poison (2023)
