= Betty Meggers =

American archaeologist (1921-2012)

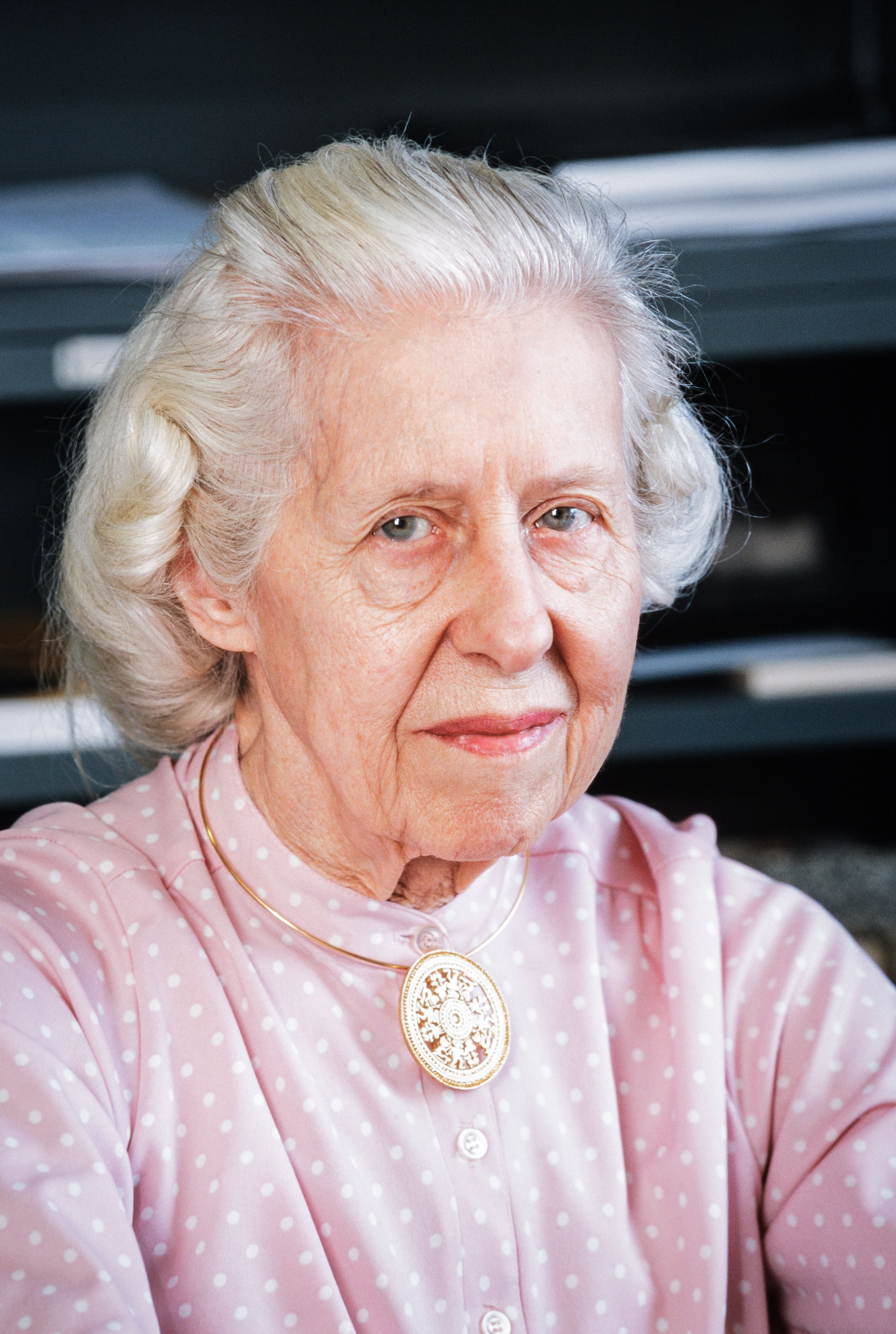
- Meggers in 2000
- Born: December 5, 1921
- Died: July 2, 2012 (aged 90)
- Education: University of Pennsylvania, University of Michigan, Columbia University
- Father: William Frederick Meggers
- Scientific career
- Fields: Anthropology in South America
- Workplaces: National Museum of Natural History, Smithsonian Institution

Betty Jane Meggers (December 5, 1921 – July 2, 2012) was an American archaeologist best known for her work in South America. She was considered influential at the Smithsonian Institution, where she was long associated in research, and she wrote extensively about environment as a shaper of human cultures.

== Education and personal life ==
Betty Jane Meggers was born in Washington, D.C., to Dr. William Frederick Meggers and Edith R. Meggers. Her father was an internationally recognized spectroscopist as well as an archaeology enthusiast. He often took the family to visit Native American sites.

Betty Meggers graduated from the University of Pennsylvania with a bachelor's degree in 1943 and a year later earned a master's degree from the University of Michigan. After obtaining her master's degree, Meggers attended Columbia University to complete her Ph.D. Meggers's dissertation, entitled The Archaeological Sequence on Marajo Island, Brazil with Special Reference to the Marajoara Culture. She completed her dissertation in 1952.

While at Columbia, Meggers met Clifford Evans, another archaeology graduate student. On September 13, 1946, the two were married.

After a long career, Meggers died on July 2, 2012.

== Research ==
Most of Meggers's research was concentrated in South America, particularly in Ecuador, Peru, Venezuela, Chile, Brazil, and Guyana. She also conducted research in the Lesser Antilles and Micronesia.

She first worked in anthropology at the age of 16, volunteering at the Smithsonian Institution and helping to reconstruct pots excavated from Pueblo Bonito, an Ancestral Pueblo village in New Mexico.

At the University of Michigan, Meggers was introduced to ancient ceramics from Marajó Island, in the Amazon Basin of Brazil. She published her first scientific article on the Marajoara culture in 1945.

In 1954, Meggers proposed her environmental limitation theory, relating the idea of productivity of environment to complexity of society. She suggested that environmental and agricultural resources acted as a limit on cultural complexity. Partly as a result of this theory, Meggers was among those who believed that early cultures did not develop in the Amazon basin. She thought settlements were established by migrants from highland areas. In the early 21st century, new archeological finds have begun to overturn her conclusions.

In the 1960s, Meggers and Evans proposed a controversial diffusionist theory to explain similarities between the pottery of the Valdivia culture in Ecuador, dated to 2700 BC, and the pottery of the Early and Middle Jōmon on the island of Kyushu, Japan. During Meggers and Evans's initial period of work in Ecuador, "Ceramic Phase A" of Valdivia was believed to be the oldest pottery produced in South America. Meggers bolstered her argument that trans-Pacific migrants from Japan were responsible for this pottery by noting that plants, pathogens, and parasites of Japanese origin are found among Andean populations. Her theory was challenged by other archaeologists due to the distance between Ecuador and Japan, and a lack of evidence for complex Jōmon sailing technologies. Excavations in the early 1970s by other researchers found pottery at Valdivia and related sites pre-dating Phase A. Archeologists thus generally now believe that pottery rose independently in the Valdivia and preceding cultures.

Meggers and Evans also developed a system by which pottery fragments could be analyzed. In addition, Meggers was among the first to examine environmental influences on ancient societies and to frame culture as an adaptation by humans to the environment. In 1994 she coined the term Mega-Niño to describe El Niño events that caused major effects over the past two millennia prior to modern recordkeeping and which can be identified by historians and archeologists from contemporaneous accounts and geologic evidence.

== Publications ==
Meggers wrote nearly two hundred articles, book reviews, translations, and books. Meggers translation of Luis Guillermo Lumbreras's The Peoples and Cultures of Ancient Peru was widely used and helped to build a close relationship between archaeological communities in Peru and the United States. Along with Clifford Evans and Marcia Koth, she encouraged younger Peruvians to study Peruvian archaeology at doctoral and postdoctoral levels.

Meggers published in many leading scientific journals such as American Anthropologist, American Antiquity, Science, and Scientific American. In addition, she published in less-specialized magazines including Archaeology, Americas, and National Geographic.

== Professional affiliations ==
Meggers was affiliated with the following:

- 1950-1951: Instructor for the American University in Washington, D.C.
- Since 1954: Research Associate for the Smithsonian Institution in Washington, D.C.
- 1959-1961: Executive Secretary of the American Anthropological Association

At the time of her death in 2012, she was:

- Principal Investigator of the Programa Nacional de Pesquisas Arqueologicas na Bacia Amazonica (PRONAPABA)
- Director of the Latin American Archaeology Program at the National Museum of Natural History (Smithsonian Institution)

== Awards ==
Meggers was widely acknowledged for her contributions to the field of archaeology and South American studies. Some of her awards are:

- 1956: Washington Academy of Sciences Award for Scientific Achievement
- 1966: Decoration of Merit from the Government of Ecuador
- 1966: 37th International Congress of Americanists Gold Medal
- 1985: Society for American Archaeology, 50th Anniversary Award
- 1997: Medalla de "La Periquera" from the Museo Provincial de Holgun, Cuba
- 1997: Doctor Honoris Causa from the Universidad Nacional de la Plata, Argentina
- 1998: Meggers & Evans awarded for "their contribution to our National Identity" by the Embassy of Ecuador, Washington, D.C.
