= Polzunov (crater) =

Crater on the Moon

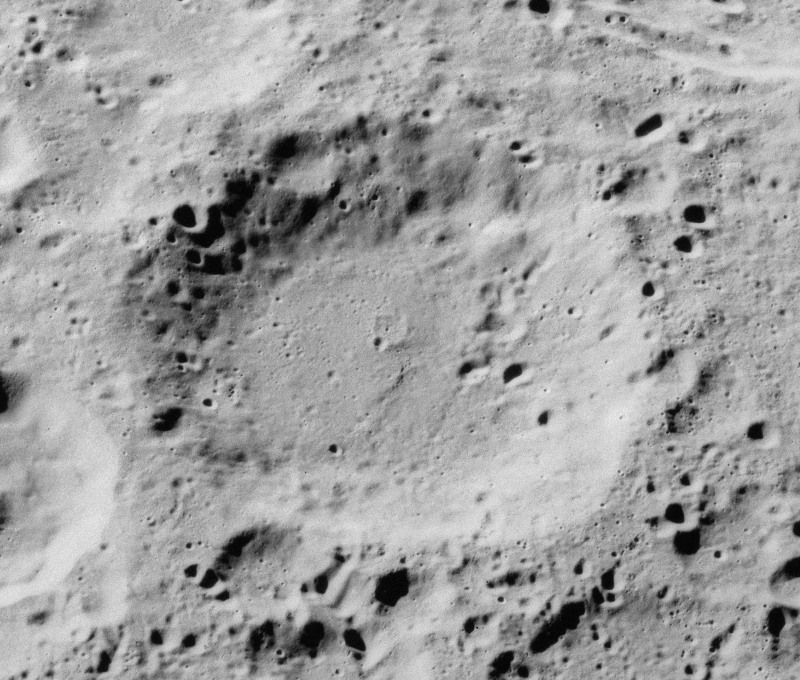
- Oblique Apollo 16 image, facing northwest
- Coordinates: 25.3°S 114.6°E
- Diameter: 67 km
- Depth: Unknown
- Colongitude: 246° at sunrise
- Eponym: Ivan I. Polzunov

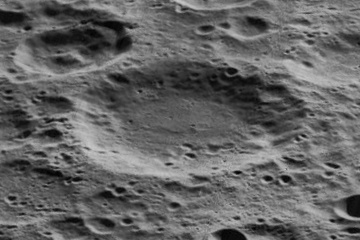
Oblique Lunar Orbiter 5 image, facing west

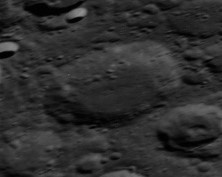
Oblique Apollo 14 Hasselblad camera image, facing east

Polzunov is a lunar impact crater that is located just to the south-southeast of the larger crater Seyfert, on the far side of the Moon. It was named after Russian heat engineer Ivan I. Polzunov. About one crater diameter to the west-southwest lies Deutsch, and somewhat farther to the south-southeast is Olcott.

This crater has a worn and eroded outer rim, although it is marked only by a few small craterlets. Along the southwestern exterior is the satellite crater Polzunov N, a relatively fresh crater with a prominent central peak. The interior of Polzunov is marked only by an uneven region near the northern end of the crater. There is no central peak to speak of, and the remainder of the floor is relatively level and marked only by a few tiny craterlets.

== Satellite craters ==
By convention these features are identified on lunar maps by placing the letter on the side of the crater midpoint that is closest to Polzunov.

| Polzunov | Latitude | Longitude | Diameter |
|---|---|---|---|
| J | 23.6° N | 117.4° E | 30 km |
| N | 23.7° N | 113.8° E | 35 km |
