= Armin Joseph Deutsch =

American astronomer

Armin Joseph Deutsch (January 25, 1918–November 11, 1969), was an American astronomer and science fiction writer.

== Life and career ==
Deutsch was born in Chicago and earned a BS from the University of Arizona in 1940 and, after wartime service as an instructor at the Army Air Force at Chanute Field in Illinois, a PhD from the University of Chicago in 1946 with a dissertation on the spectra of A-type variable stars.

As a graduate student, he was an instructor at Yerkes Observatory. After completing his doctorate, he was an instructor at Ohio State University for one year and then in 1947 moved to Harvard University, where he was promoted to lecturer in 1949. Beginning in 1951 he was on the staff of the Mount Wilson and Palomar Observatory in California; he died in Pasadena in 1969.

Deutsch's research continued to focus on the A-type stars. He established that Horace Babcock and Douglas W. N. Stibbs's oblique rotator model explained the anomalous variability of Ap stars, and later studied other anomalous hot stars, such as the blue stragglers; he suggested that both they and the Sun had rapidly rotating cores. He introduced Doppler tomography in 1958, at a symposium at Mount Wilson. He was associate editor of the Annual Review of Astronomy and Astrophysics, and a councillor of the American Astronomical Society from 1964 to 1967.

His short story "A Subway Named Mobius", a fantasy based on mathematics and particularly topology published in December 1950, has been much anthologized and was nominated for a Retro Hugo in 2001; it placed 4th.

== Selected scientific publications ==
- Armin J. Deutsch, "The Sun", in The New Astronomy, a Scientific American Book, New York: Simon and Schuster, 1955
- A. Deutsch, W. Klemperer, eds., Space Age Astronomy: Proceedings of an International Symposium held August 7–9, 1961 at the California Institute of Technology in conjunction with the 11th General Assembly of the International Astronomical Union (IAU, GA, 11), New York: Academic Press, 1962
- Armin J. Deutsch, "The Ageing Stars of the Milky Way", in Stars and Galaxies: Birth, Ageing, and Death in the Universe, ed. Thornton Leigh Page, Englewood Cliffs, New Jersey: Prentice-Hall, 1962
- Ann Merchant Boesgaard, Wendy Hagen, Armin J. Deutsch, "Circumstellar Envelopes of M Giants", Bulletin of the American Astronomical Society, Vol. 8, p. 304, March 1976 (his last paper, published posthumously)

== Honors ==
The crater Deutsch on the far side of the Moon is named after him.
