= T. H. E. C. Espin =

- Born: Thomas Henry Espinell Compton Espin; 28 May 1858
- Died: 2 December 1934 (aged 76)
- Education: Haileybury School; Exeter College, Oxford
- Occupations: Astronomer, Anglican clergyman
- Known for: Discoveries of nebulae, variable stars, and double stars Discovery of DI Lacertae
- Parent(s): Thomas Espin; Elizabeth Jessop
- Awards: Jackson-Gwilt Medal (1913)

The Reverend Thomas Henry Espinell Compton Espin (28 May 1858 – 2 December 1934), often known as T. H. E. C. Espin, was a British astronomer and clergyman.

== Early life and education ==
Espin was born to Elizabeth (née Jessop) and Thomas Espin, who served as the Chancellor of the Diocese of Chester. He developed an interest in astronomy after observing Coggia's Comet (C/1874 H1) while attending Haileybury School. He subsequently studied at Exeter College, Oxford, from 1878 to 1881. He was ordained as a priest the following year.

== Astronomical career ==
Espin was an avid amateur astronomer and skilled observer, having been elected a Fellow of the Royal Astronomical Society on 11 January 1878. In 1876, at the age of eighteen, he became acquainted with the Reverend Thomas William Webb (1807–1885) and assisted him with an updated edition of his book Celestial Objects for Common Telescopes. After Webb's death, Espin published expanded fifth (1893) and sixth (1917) editions of the work.

In 1885, Espin was appointed Curate of Wolsingham, where he established an astronomical observatory. In 1888, he relocated to Tow Law, serving there for the remainder of his life and transferring the observatory with him. The facility housed a 17 1/4-inch (438 mm) aperture reflecting telescope, which was later supplemented by a 24-inch (620 mm) reflector. During his career, Espin discovered numerous nebulae, variable stars, and more than 2,500 double stars. He conducted extensive spectral observations of stars, with a particular focus on identifying red stars during his early career, eventually publishing a catalogue of his findings. In December 1910, he discovered a nova in the constellation Lacerta, an object later designated as DI Lacertae.

From 1912, he was assisted in his astronomical observations by William Milburn (1896–1982), the grandson of a family friend. In recognition of his contributions to astronomy, Espin was awarded the Jackson-Gwilt Medal by the Royal Astronomical Society in 1913.

== Other interests and personal life ==
Beyond astronomy, Espin's amateur scientific interests included botany, geology, and the study of X-rays. His studies of fossils led him to reject Charles Darwin's theory of evolution.

He also served as a county magistrate for 35 years, beginning in 1891, and was the chairman of the Stanhope and Wolsingham Sessions. Espin never married.

The lunar crater Espin is named in his honor.
