= Seyfert (crater) =

Crater on the Moon

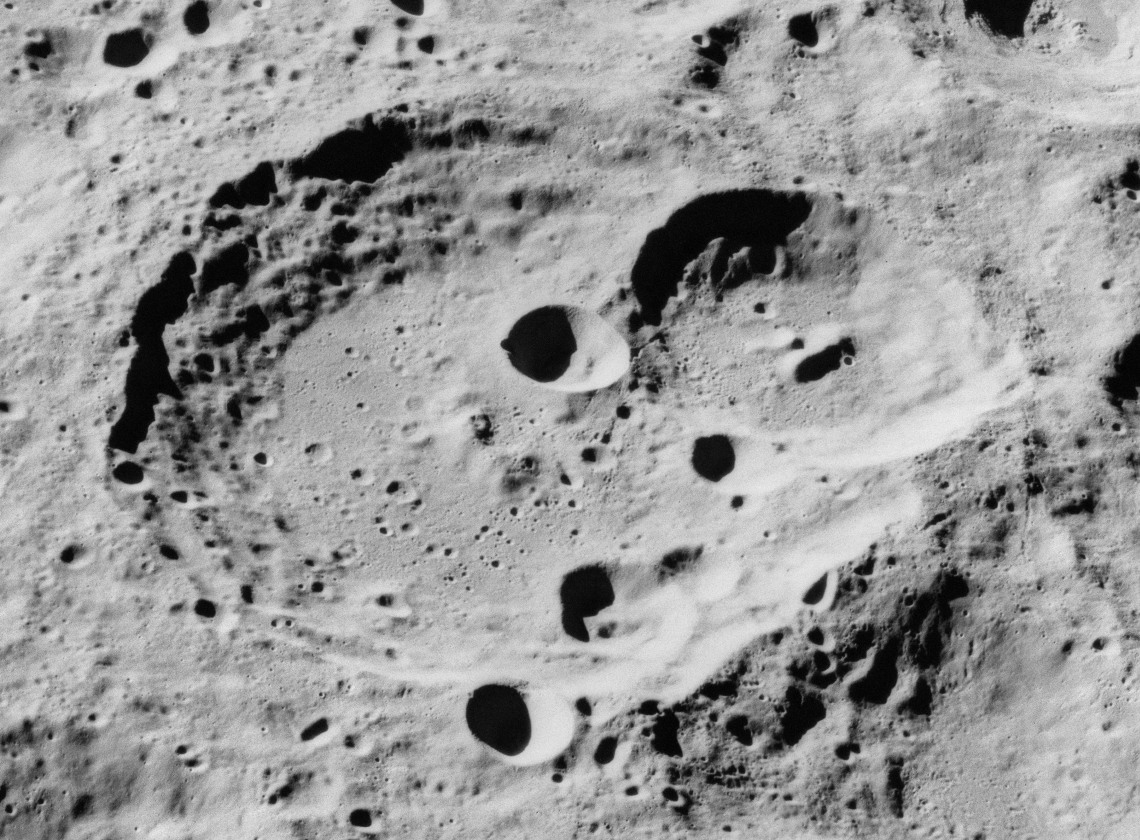
- Oblique Apollo 16 image (facing northwest)
- Coordinates: 29.26°N 114.34°E
- Diameter: 102.63 km (63.77 mi)
- Depth: Unknown
- Colongitude: 247° at sunrise
- Eponym: Carl K. Seyfert

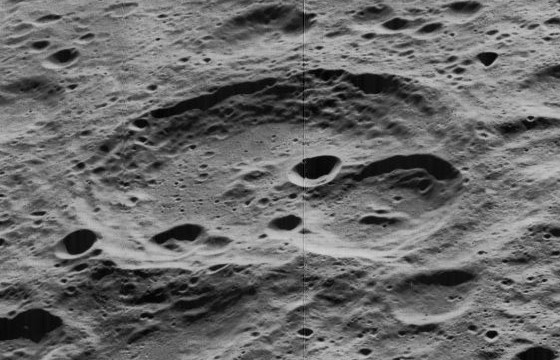
Oblique Lunar Orbiter 5 image (facing west)

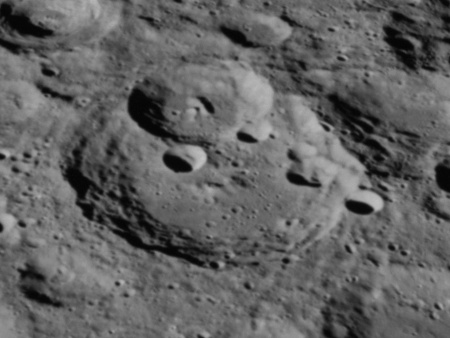
Oblique Apollo 14 Hasselblad camera image (facing northeast)

Seyfert is a prominent lunar impact crater that is located on the far side of the Moon. It lies behind the eastern limb of the Moon, to the east of the crater Espin. Just to the north of Seyfert is the crater Harriot and equally close to the south is Polzunov.

The outer rim of this crater is slightly elongated to the north, and the northeastern rim is overlain by the satellite crater Seyfert A. This overlapping impact crater has a central ridge on its interior floor. There is a low ridge near the midpoint of Seyfert, but it is less prominent. The inner wall of Seyfert is wider along the northern edge, west of Seyfert A.

Several small craters lie along the rim and interior of Seyfert, including a merged group of small craters along the eastern inner wall, a small crater intruding into the southeastern rim, and a pair of small craters along the southern rim of Seyfert A. The interior floor of Seyfert is relatively level, and is marked by a number of tiny craterlets. Traces of the ray system from Giordano Bruno to the northwest lie along the rim and interior floor of Seyfert.

The crater was named after American astronomer Carl Keenan Seyfert. Prior to formal naming in 1970 by the IAU, Seyfert was known as Crater 120.

== Satellite craters ==
By convention these features are identified on lunar maps by placing the letter on the side of the crater midpoint that is closest to Seyfert.

Seyfert	Latitude	Longitude	Diameter
A	30.5° N	114.9° E	53 km
