= Pascal's theorem =

Theorem in projective geometry

Pascal line GHK of self-crossing hexagon ABCDEF inscribed in ellipse. Opposite sides of hexagon have the same color.

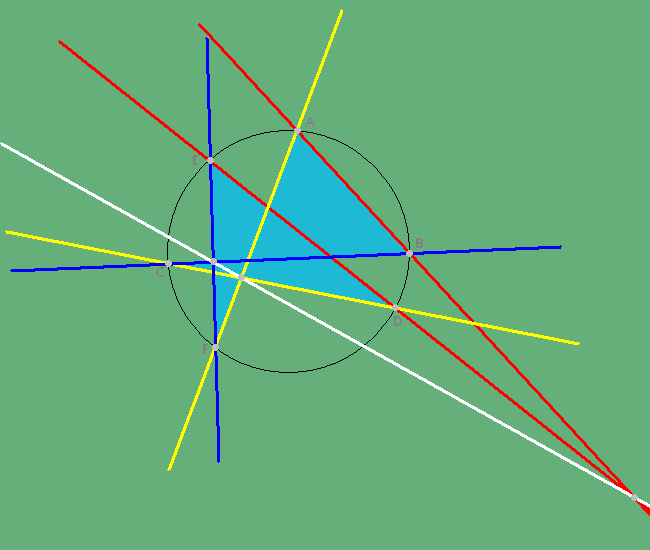
Self-crossing hexagon ABCDEF, inscribed in a circle. Its sides are extended so that pairs of opposite sides intersect on Pascal's line. Each pair of extended opposite sides has its own color: one red, one yellow, one blue. Pascal's line is shown in white.

In projective geometry, Pascal's theorem (also known as the hexagrammum mysticum theorem, Latin for mystical hexagram) states that if six arbitrary points are chosen on a conic (which may be an ellipse, parabola or hyperbola in an appropriate affine plane) and joined by line segments in any order to form a hexagon, then the three pairs of opposite sides of the hexagon (extended if necessary) meet at three points which lie on a straight line, called the Pascal line of the hexagon. It is named after Blaise Pascal.

The theorem is also valid in the Euclidean plane, but the statement needs to be adjusted to deal with the special cases when opposite sides are parallel.

This theorem is a generalization of Pappus's (hexagon) theorem, which is the special case of a degenerate conic of two lines with three points on each line.

== Euclidean variants ==
The most natural setting for Pascal's theorem is in a projective plane since any two lines meet and no exceptions need to be made for parallel lines. However, the theorem remains valid in the Euclidean plane, with the correct interpretation of what happens when some opposite sides of the hexagon are parallel.

If exactly one pair of opposite sides of the hexagon is parallel, then the conclusion of the theorem is that the "Pascal line" determined by the two points of intersection is parallel to the parallel sides of the hexagon. If two pairs of opposite sides are parallel, then the third pair of opposite sides is also parallel, and there is no Pascal line in the Euclidean plane (in this case, the line at infinity of the extended Euclidean plane is the Pascal line of the hexagon).

== Related results ==
Pascal's theorem is the polar reciprocal and projective dual of Brianchon's theorem. It was formulated by Blaise Pascal in a note written in 1639 when he was 16 years old and published the following year as a broadside titled "Essay pour les coniques. Par B. P."

Pascal's theorem is a special case of the Cayley–Bacharach theorem.

A degenerate case of Pascal's theorem (four points) is interesting; given points ABCD on a conic Γ, the intersection of alternate sides, AB ∩ CD, BC ∩ DA, together with the intersection of tangents at opposite vertices (A, C) and (B, D) are collinear in four points; the tangents being degenerate 'sides', taken at two possible positions on the 'hexagon' and the corresponding Pascal line sharing either degenerate intersection. This can be proven independently using a property of pole-polar. If the conic is a circle, then another degenerate case says that for a triangle, the three points that appear as the intersection of a side line with the corresponding side line of the Gergonne triangle, are collinear.

Six is the minimum number of points on a conic about which special statements can be made, as five points determine a conic.

The converse is the Braikenridge–Maclaurin theorem, named for 18th-century British mathematicians William Braikenridge and Colin Maclaurin (Mills 1984), which states that if the three intersection points of the three pairs of lines through opposite sides of a hexagon lie on a line, then the six vertices of the hexagon lie on a conic; the conic may be degenerate, as in Pappus's theorem. The Braikenridge–Maclaurin theorem may be applied in the Braikenridge–Maclaurin construction, which is a synthetic construction of the conic defined by five points, by varying the sixth point.

The theorem was generalized by August Ferdinand Möbius in 1847, as follows: suppose a polygon with 4n + 2 sides is inscribed in a conic section, and opposite pairs of sides are extended until they meet in 2n + 1 points. Then if 2n of those points lie on a common line, the last point will be on that line, too.

== Hexagrammum Mysticum ==
If six unordered points are given on a conic section, they can be connected into a hexagon in 60 different ways, resulting in 60 different instances of Pascal's theorem and 60 different Pascal lines. This configuration of 60 lines is called the Hexagrammum Mysticum.

As Thomas Kirkman proved in 1849, these 60 lines can be associated with 60 points in such a way that each point is on three lines and each line contains three points. The 60 points formed in this way are now known as the Kirkman points. The Pascal lines also pass, three at a time, through 20 Steiner points. There are 20 Cayley lines which consist of a Steiner point and three Kirkman points. The Steiner points also lie, four at a time, on 15 Plücker lines. Furthermore, the 20 Cayley lines pass four at a time through 15 points known as the Salmon points.

== Proofs ==
Pascal's original note has no proof, but there are various modern proofs of the theorem.

It is sufficient to prove the theorem when the conic is a circle, because any (non-degenerate) conic can be reduced to a circle by a projective transformation. This was realised by Pascal, whose first lemma states the theorem for a circle. His second lemma states that what is true in one plane remains true upon projection to another plane. Degenerate conics follow by continuity (the theorem is true for non-degenerate conics, and thus holds in the limit of degenerate conic).

A short elementary proof of Pascal's theorem in the case of a circle was found by van Yzeren (1993), based on the proof in (Guggenheimer 1967). This proof proves the theorem for circle and then generalizes it to conics.

A short elementary computational proof in the case of the real projective plane was found by Stefanovic (2010).

We can infer the proof from existence of isogonal conjugate too. If we are to show that X = AB ∩ DE, Y = BC ∩ EF, Z = CD ∩ FA are collinear for concyclic ABCDEF, then notice that △EYB and △CYF are similar, and that X and Z will correspond to the isogonal conjugate if we overlap the similar triangles. This means that ∠CYX = ∠CYZ, hence making XYZ collinear.

A short proof can be constructed using cross-ratio preservation. Projecting tetrad ABCE from D onto line AB, we obtain tetrad ABPX, and projecting tetrad ABCE from F onto line BC, we obtain tetrad QBCY. This therefore means that R(AB; PX) = R(QB; CY), where one of the points in the two tetrads overlap, hence meaning that other lines connecting the other three pairs must coincide to preserve cross ratio. Therefore, XYZ are collinear.

Another proof for Pascal's theorem for a circle uses Menelaus' theorem repeatedly.

Dandelin, the geometer after whom Dandelin spheres are named, came up with a proof of Pascal's theorem using a "3D lifting" technique that is analogous to the 3D proof of Desargues' theorem. The proof makes use of the property that for every conic section we can find a one-sheet hyperboloid which passes through the conic.

There also exists a simple proof for Pascal's theorem for a circle using the law of sines and similarity.

== Proof using cubic curves ==
The intersections of the extended opposite sides of simple cyclic hexagon ABCDEF (right) lie on the Pascal line MNP (left).

Pascal's theorem has a short proof using the Cayley–Bacharach theorem that given any 8 points in general position, there is a unique ninth point such that all cubics through the first 8 also pass through the ninth point. In particular, if 2 general cubics intersect in 8 points then any other cubic through the same 8 points meets the ninth point of intersection of the first two cubics. Pascal's theorem follows by taking the 8 points as the 6 points on the hexagon and two of the points (say, M and N in the figure) on the would-be Pascal line, and the ninth point as the third point (P in the figure). The first two cubics are two sets of 3 lines through the 6 points on the hexagon (for instance, the set AB, CD, EF, and the set BC, DE, FA), and the third cubic is the union of the conic and the line MN. Here the "ninth intersection" P cannot lie on the conic by genericity, and hence it lies on MN.

The Cayley–Bacharach theorem is also used to prove that the group operation on cubic elliptic curves is associative. The same group operation can be applied on a conic if we choose a point E on the conic and a line MP in the plane. The sum of A and B is obtained by first finding the intersection point of line AB with MP, which is M. Next A and B add up to the second intersection point of the conic with line EM, which is D. Thus if Q is the second intersection point of the conic with line EN, then

$$(A + B) + C = D + C = Q = A + F = A + (B + C)$$

Thus the group operation is associative. On the other hand, Pascal's theorem follows from the above associativity formula, and thus from the associativity of the group operation of elliptic curves by way of continuity.

== Proof using Bézout's theorem ==
Suppose f is the cubic polynomial vanishing on the three lines through AB, CD, EF and g is the cubic vanishing on the other three lines BC, DE, FA. Pick a generic point P on the conic and choose λ so that the cubic h = f + λg vanishes on P. Then h = 0 is a cubic that has 7 points A, B, C, D, E, F, P in common with the conic. But by Bézout's theorem a cubic and a conic have at most 3 × 2 = 6 points in common, unless they have a common component. So the cubic h = 0 has a component in common with the conic which must be the conic itself, so h = 0 is the union of the conic and a line. This line is the Pascal line, because any point in the intersection of the solution sets of f and g will also be in the solution set of h.

== A property of Pascal's hexagon ==
Again given the hexagon on a conic of Pascal's theorem with the above notation for points (in the first figure), we have

$$\frac{\overline{GB}}{\overline{GA}} \times \frac{\overline{HA}}{\overline{HF}} \times \frac{\overline{KF}}{\overline{KE}} \times\frac{\overline{GE}}{\overline{GD}} \times \frac{\overline{HD}}{\overline{HC}} \times \frac{\overline{KC}}{\overline{KB}}=1.$$

== Degenerations of Pascal's theorem ==
Pascal's theorem: degenerations

There exist 5-point, 4-point and 3-point degenerate cases of Pascal's theorem. In a degenerate case, two previously connected points of the figure will formally coincide and the connecting line becomes the tangent at the coalesced point. See the degenerate cases given in the added scheme and the external link on circle geometries. If one chooses suitable lines of the Pascal-figures as lines at infinity one gets many interesting figures on parabolas and hyperbolas.

== See also ==
- Desargues's theorem
- Brianchon's theorem
