= Linear system of conics =

In algebraic geometry, the conic sections in the projective plane form a linear system of dimension five, as one sees by counting the constants in the degree two equations. The condition to pass through a given point P imposes a single linear condition, so that conics C through P form a linear system of dimension 4. Other types of condition that are of interest include tangency to a given line L.

In the most elementary treatments a linear system appears in the form of equations

$$\lambda C + \mu C' = 0\$$

with λ and μ unknown scalars, not both zero. Here C and C′ are given conics. Abstractly we can say that this is a projective line in the space of all conics, on which we take

$$[\lambda : \mu]\$$

as homogeneous coordinates. Geometrically we notice that any point Q common to C and C′ is also on each of the conics of the linear system. According to Bézout's theorem C and C′ will intersect in four points (if counted correctly). Assuming these are in general position, i.e. four distinct intersections, we get another interpretation of the linear system as the conics passing through the four given points (note that the codimension four here matches the dimension, one, in the five-dimensional space of conics). Note that of these conics, exactly three are degenerate, each consisting of a pair of lines, corresponding to the $\textstyle{\binom{4}{2,2}/2=3}$ ways of choosing 2 pairs of points from 4 points (counting via the multinomial coefficient, and accounting for the overcount by a factor of 2 that $\textstyle{\binom{4}{2}}$ makes when interested in counting pairs of pairs rather than just selections of size 2).

== Applications ==
A striking application of such a family is in (Faucette 1996) which gives a geometric solution to a quartic equation by considering the pencil of conics through the four roots of the quartic, and identifying the three degenerate conics with the three roots of the resolvent cubic.

== Example ==
External videos
- Type I linear system, (Coffman).

For example, given the four points $(\pm 1, \pm 1),$ the pencil of conics through them can be parameterized as $ax^2+(1-a)y^2=1,$ which are the affine combinations of the equations $x^2=1$ and $y^2=1,$ corresponding to the parallel vertical lines and horizontal lines; this yields degenerate conics at the standard points of $0,1,\infty.$ A less elegant but more symmetric parametrization is given by $(1+a)x^2+(1-a)y^2=2,$ in which case inverting a ($a \mapsto -a$) interchanges x and y, yielding the following pencil; in all cases the center is at the origin:

- $a>1:$ hyperbolae opening left and right;
- $a=1:$ the parallel vertical lines $x=-1, x=1;$

(intersection point at [1:0:0])

- $0 < a < 1:$ ellipses with a vertical major axis;
- $a=0:$ a circle (with radius $\sqrt{2}$);
- $-1 < a < 0:$ ellipses with a horizontal major axis;
- $a=-1:$ the parallel horizontal lines $y=-1, y=1;$

(intersection point at [0:1:0])

- $a<-1:$ hyperbolae opening up and down,
- $a=\infty:$ the diagonal lines $y=x, y=-x;$

(dividing by $a$ and taking the limit as $a \to \infty$ yields $x^2-y^2=0$)
(intersection point at [0:0:1])

- This then loops around to $a>1,$ since pencils are a projective line.

In the terminology of (Levy 1964), this is a Type I linear system of conics, and is animated in the linked video.

== Classification ==
There are 8 types of linear systems of conics over the complex numbers, depending on intersection multiplicity at the base points, which divide into 13 types over the real numbers, depending on whether the base points are real or imaginary; this is discussed in (Levy 1964) and illustrated in (Coffman).
