= Degenerate conic =

2nd-degree plane curve which is reducible

$x^2-y^2=0$

$x^2-1=0$

$x^2=0$

$x^2+y^2=0$

In geometry, a degenerate conic is a conic (a second-degree plane curve, defined by a polynomial equation of degree two) that fails to be an irreducible curve. This means that the defining equation is factorable over the complex numbers (or more generally over an algebraically closed field) as the product of two linear polynomials.

Using the alternative definition of the conic as the intersection in three-dimensional space of a plane and a double cone, a conic is degenerate if the plane goes through the vertex of the cones.

In the real plane, a degenerate conic can be two lines that may or may not be parallel, a single line (either two coinciding lines or the union of a line and the line at infinity), a single point (in fact, two complex conjugate lines), or the null set (twice the line at infinity or two parallel complex conjugate lines).

All these degenerate conics may occur in pencils of conics. That is, if two real non-degenerated conics are defined by quadratic polynomial equations f = 0 and g = 0, the conics of equations af + bg = 0 form a pencil, which contains one or three degenerate conics. For any degenerate conic in the real plane, one may choose f and g so that the given degenerate conic belongs to the pencil they determine.

== Examples ==
Pencils of circles: In the pencil of red circles, the only degenerate conic is the horizontal axis; the pencil of blue circles has three degenerate conics: the vertical axis and two circles of radius zero.

The conic section with equation $x^2-y^2 = 0$ is degenerate as its equation can be written as $(x-y)(x+y)= 0$, and corresponds to two intersecting lines forming an "X". This degenerate conic occurs as the limit case $a=1, b=0$ in the pencil of hyperbolas of equations $a(x^2-y^2) - b=0.$ The limiting case $a=0, b=1$ is an example of a degenerate conic consisting of twice the line at infinity.

Similarly, the conic section with equation $x^2 + y^2 = 0$, which has only one real point, is degenerate, as $x^2+y^2$ is factorable as $(x+iy)(x-iy)$ over the complex numbers. The conic consists thus of two complex conjugate lines that intersect in the unique real point, $(0,0)$, of the conic.

The pencil of ellipses of equations $ax^2+b(y^2-1)=0$ degenerates, for $a=0, b=1$, into two parallel lines and, for $a=1, b=0$, into a double line.

The pencil of circles of equations $a(x^2+y^2-1) - bx =0$ degenerates for $a=0$ into two lines, the line at infinity and the line of equation $x=0$.

== Classification ==
Over the complex projective plane there are only two types of degenerate conics – two different lines, which necessarily intersect in one point, or one double line. Any degenerate conic may be transformed by a projective transformation into any other degenerate conic of the same type.

Over the real affine plane the situation is more complicated. A degenerate real conic may be:

- Two intersecting lines, such as $x^2-y^2 = 0 \Leftrightarrow (x+y)(x-y) = 0$
- Two parallel lines, such as $x^2-1 = 0 \Leftrightarrow (x+1)(x-1) = 0$
- A double line (multiplicity 2), such as $x^2 = 0$
- Two intersecting complex conjugate lines (only one real point), such as $x^2+y^2 = 0 \Leftrightarrow (x+iy)(x-iy) = 0$
- Two parallel complex conjugate lines (no real point), such as $x^2+1 = 0 \Leftrightarrow (x+i)(x-i) = 0$
- A single line and the line at infinity
- Twice the line at infinity (no real point in the affine plane)

For any two degenerate conics of the same class, there are affine transformations mapping the first conic to the second one.

== Discriminant ==
The degenerate hyperbola $3x^2-2xy-y^2-6x+10y-9=0,$ which factors as $(x-y+1)(3x+y-9)=0,$ is the union of the red and blue loci.

The degenerate parabola $9x^2+12xy+4y^2-54x-36y+72$ $=0,$ which factors as $(3x+2y-6)(3x+2y-12)=0,$ is the union of the red and blue loci.

Non-degenerate real conics can be classified as ellipses, parabolas, or hyperbolas by the discriminant of the non-homogeneous form $Ax^2 + 2Bxy + Cy^2 + 2Dx + 2Ey + F$, which is the determinant of the matrix

$$M=\begin{bmatrix} A & B \\ B & C \\ \end{bmatrix},$$

the matrix of the quadratic form in $(x,y)$. This determinant is positive, zero, or negative as the conic is, respectively, an ellipse, a parabola, or a hyperbola.

Analogously, a conic can be classified as non-degenerate or degenerate according to the discriminant of the homogeneous quadratic form in $(x,y,z)$. Here the affine form is homogenized to

$$Ax^2 + 2Bxy + Cy^2 +2Dxz + 2Eyz + Fz^2;$$

the discriminant of this form is the determinant of the matrix

$$Q=\begin{bmatrix} A & B & D \\ B & C & E \\ D & E & F \\ \end{bmatrix}.$$

The conic is degenerate if and only if the determinant of this matrix equals zero. In this case, we have the following possibilities:

- Two intersecting lines (a hyperbola degenerated to its two asymptotes) if and only if $\det M< 0$ (see first diagram).
- Two parallel straight lines (a degenerate parabola) if and only if $\det M= 0$. These lines are distinct and real if $D^2+E^2>(A+C)F$ (see second diagram), coincident if $D^2+E^2=(A+C)F$, and non-existent in the real plane if $D^2+E^2<(A+C)F$.
- A single point (a degenerate ellipse) if and only if $\det M> 0$.
- A single line (and the line at infinity) if and only if $A=B=C=0,$ and $D$ and $E$ are not both zero. This case always occurs as a degenerate conic in a pencil of circles. However, in other contexts it is not considered as a degenerate conic, as its equation is not of degree 2.

The case of coincident lines occurs if and only if the rank of the 3×3 matrix $Q$ is 1; in all other degenerate cases its rank is 2.

== Relation to intersection of a plane and a cone ==
Conics, also known as conic sections to emphasize their three-dimensional geometry, arise as the intersection of a plane with a cone. Degeneracy occurs when the plane contains the apex of the cone or when the cone degenerates to a cylinder and the plane is parallel to the axis of the cylinder. See Conic section#Degenerate cases for details.

== Applications ==
Degenerate conics, as with degenerate algebraic varieties generally, arise as limits of non-degenerate conics, and are important in compactification of moduli spaces of curves.

For example, the pencil of curves (1-dimensional linear system of conics) defined by $x^2 + ay^2 = 1$ is non-degenerate for $a\neq 0$ but is degenerate for $a=0;$ concretely, it is an ellipse for $a>0,$ two parallel lines for $a=0,$ and a hyperbola with $a<0$ – throughout, one axis has length 2 and the other has length $1/\sqrt{|a|},$ which is infinity for $a=0.$

Such families arise naturally – given four points in general linear position (no three on a line), there is a pencil of conics through them (five points determine a conic, four points leave one parameter free), of which three are degenerate, each consisting of a pair of lines, corresponding to the $\textstyle{\binom{4}{2,2}=3}$ ways of choosing 2 pairs of points from 4 points (counting via the multinomial coefficient).

External videos
- Type I linear system, (Coffman).

For example, given the four points $(\pm 1, \pm 1),$ the pencil of conics through them can be parameterized as $(1+a)x^2+(1-a)y^2=2,$ yielding the following pencil; in all cases the center is at the origin: (Note: A simpler parametrization is given by $ax^2+(1-a)y^2=1,$ which are the affine combinations of the equations $x^2=1$ and $y^2=1,$ corresponding the parallel vertical lines and horizontal lines, and results in the degenerate conics falling at the standard points of $0,1,\infty.$)

- $a>1:$ hyperbolae opening left and right;
- $a=1:$ the parallel vertical lines $x=-1,\ x=1;$
- $0 < a < 1:$ ellipses with a vertical major axis;
- $a=0:$ a circle (with radius $\sqrt{2}$);
- $-1 < a < 0:$ ellipses with a horizontal major axis;
- $a=-1:$ the parallel horizontal lines $y=-1,\ y=1;$
- $a<-1:$ hyperbolae opening up and down,
- $a=\infty:$ the diagonal lines $y=x,\ y=-x;$

(dividing by $a$ and taking the limit as $a \to \infty$ yields $x^2-y^2=0$)

- This then loops around to $a>1,$ since pencils are a projective line.

Note that this parametrization has a symmetry, where inverting the sign of a reverses x and y. In the terminology of (Levy 1964), this is a Type I linear system of conics, and is animated in the linked video.

A striking application of such a family is in (Faucette 1996) which gives a geometric solution to a quartic equation by considering the pencil of conics through the four roots of the quartic, and identifying the three degenerate conics with the three roots of the resolvent cubic.

Pappus's hexagon theorem is the special case of Pascal's theorem, when a conic degenerates to two lines.

== Degeneration ==
In the complex projective plane, all conics are equivalent, and can degenerate to either two different lines or one double line.

In the real affine plane:

- Hyperbolas can degenerate to two intersecting lines (the asymptotes), as in $x^2-y^2=a^2,$ or to two parallel lines: $x^2-a^2y^2=1,$ or to the double line $x^2-a^2y^2=a^2,$ as a goes to 0.
- Parabolas can degenerate to two parallel lines: $x^2-ay-1=0$ or the double line $x^2-ay=0,$ as a goes to 0; but, because parabolae have a double point at infinity, cannot degenerate to two intersecting lines.
- Ellipses can degenerate to two parallel lines: $x^2+a^2y^2-1=0$ or the double line $x^2+a^2y^2-a^2=0,$ as a goes to 0; but, because they have conjugate complex points at infinity which become a double point on degeneration, cannot degenerate to two intersecting lines.

Degenerate conics can degenerate further to more special degenerate conics, as indicated by the dimensions of the spaces and points at infinity.

- Two intersecting lines can degenerate to two parallel lines, by rotating until parallel, as in $x^2-ay^2-1=0,$ or to a double line by rotating into each other about a point, as in $x^2-ay^2=0,$ in each case as a goes to 0.
- Two parallel lines can degenerate to a double line by moving into each other, as in $x^2-a^2=0$ as a goes to 0, but cannot degenerate to non-parallel lines.
- A double line cannot degenerate to the other types.
- Another type of degeneration occurs for an ellipse when the sum of the distances to the foci is mandated to equal the interfocal distance; thus it has semi-minor axis equal to zero and has eccentricity equal to one. The result is a line segment (degenerate because the ellipse is not differentiable at the endpoints) with its foci at the endpoints. As an orbit, this is a radial elliptic trajectory.

== Points to define ==
A general conic is defined by five points: given five points in general position, there is a unique conic passing through them. If three of these points lie on a line, then the conic is reducible, and may or may not be unique. If no four points are collinear, then five points define a unique conic (degenerate if three points are collinear, but the other two points determine the unique other line). If four points are collinear, however, then there is not a unique conic passing through them – one line passing through the four points, and the remaining line passes through the other point, but the angle is undefined, leaving 1 parameter free. If all five points are collinear, then the remaining line is free, which leaves 2 parameters free.

Given four points in general linear position (no three collinear; in particular, no two coincident), there are exactly three pairs of lines (degenerate conics) passing through them, which will in general be intersecting, unless the points form a trapezoid (one pair is parallel) or a parallelogram (two pairs are parallel).

Given three points, if they are non-collinear, there are three pairs of parallel lines passing through them – choose two to define one line, and the third for the parallel line to pass through, by the parallel postulate.

Given two distinct points, there is a unique double line through them.
