= Isaak Bacharach =

German mathematician

- Born: 2 December 1854; Seligenstadt, Hesse, German Confederation
- Died: 22 September 1942 (aged 87); Theresienstadt concentration camp, Protectorate of Bohemia and Moravia
- Education: University of Erlangen-Nuremberg
- Known for: Cayley–Bacharach theorem
- Scientific career
- Fields: Mathematics
- Thesis: Über Schnittpunktsysteme algebraischer Curven (1881)

Isaak Bacharach (2 December 1854 – 22 September 1942) was a German mathematics professor in Erlangen who proved the Cayley–Bacharach theorem on intersections of cubic curves.

He was murdered at the Theresienstadt concentration camp during The Holocaust.
