= Abu al-Jud =

Iranian mathematician

Abū al-Jūd Muḥammad b. Aḥmad b. al-Layth Persian: ابو جود محمد بن احمد بن لیث was an Iranian mathematician who lived during 10th century and was a contemporary of al-Biruni. He used conics to solve quartic and cubic equations, a century before the more famous work of Omar Khayyam, although his solution did not deal with all the cases.

== Life ==
Not much is known about his life. He seems to have lived in the east of Khurasan, within Samanid territory. Sa'id al-Andalusi claimed that he lived in Valencia (Balansiya) and died in 1014 or 1015, but other sources didn't mention these information. It is likely that he became a scribe after acquiring basic knowledge on mathematics.
