= Germinal Pierre Dandelin =

French mathematician, soldier and professor of engineering

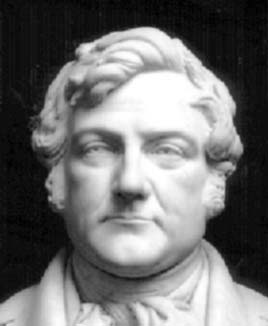
Germinal Pierre Dandelin

Germinal Pierre Dandelin (/ˈdændələn/; French pronunciation: [ʒɛʁminal pjɛʁ dɑ̃dlɛ̃], 12 April 1794 – 15 February 1847) was a French mathematician, soldier, and professor of engineering.

== Life ==
He was born near Paris to a French father and Belgian mother, studying first at Ghent then returning to Paris to study at the École Polytechnique. He was wounded fighting under Napoleon. He worked for the Ministry of the Interior under Lazare Carnot. Later he became a citizen of the Netherlands, a professor of mining engineering in Belgium, and then a member of the Belgian army.

== Work ==
He is the eponym of the Dandelin spheres, of Dandelin's theorem in geometry (for an account of that theorem, see Dandelin spheres), and of the Dandelin–Gräffe numerical method of solution of algebraic equations. He also published on the stereographic projection, algebra, and probability theory.
