= Dandelin spheres =

Spheres tangent to a plane inside a cone

Two Dandelin spheres touch the pale yellow plane that intersects the cone. The points of tangency F_{1}, F_{2} are the foci of the blue ellipse. The spheres are also tangent to the cone at circles k_{1}, k_{2}. For a point P on the ellipse, the tangent segments PF_{1} and PF_{2} can each be reflected to other tangents of equal length, PF_{1} = PP_{1} and PF_{2} = PP_{2}, with PP_{1} and PP_{2} colinear along the ray SP. Their combined length P_{1}P + PP_{2} = P_{1}P_{2} = L is the distance between circles k_{1} and k_{2}, and is independent of the choice of P; thus any point on the ellipse has PF_{1} + PF_{2} = L.

This construction shows how the focal points of an ellipse can be found using the Dandelin spheres. The angle bisector between the line representing the plane and a line representing the cone surface leads to the center of the respective sphere.

In geometry, the Dandelin spheres are one or two spheres that are tangent both to a plane and to a cone that intersects the plane. The intersection of the cone and the plane is a conic section, and the point at which either sphere touches the plane is a focus of the conic section, so the Dandelin spheres are also sometimes called focal spheres.

The Dandelin spheres were discovered in 1822. They are named in honor of the French mathematician Germinal Pierre Dandelin, though Adolphe Quetelet is sometimes given partial credit as well.

The Dandelin spheres can be used to give elegant modern proofs of two classical theorems known to Apollonius. The first theorem is that a closed conic section (i.e. an ellipse) is the locus of points such that the sum of the distances to two fixed points (the foci) is constant. The second theorem is that for any conic section, the distance from a fixed point (the focus) is proportional to the distance from a fixed line (the directrix), the constant of proportionality being called the eccentricity.

A conic section has one Dandelin sphere for each focus. An ellipse has two Dandelin spheres touching the same nappe of the cone, while hyperbola has two Dandelin spheres touching opposite nappes. A parabola has just one Dandelin sphere.

== Proof that the intersection curve has constant sum of distances to foci ==
Consider the illustration, depicting a cone with apex S at the top. A plane e intersects the cone in a curve C (with blue interior). The following proof shall show that the curve C is an ellipse.

The two brown Dandelin spheres, G_{1} and G_{2}, are placed tangent to both the plane and the cone: G_{1} above the plane, G_{2} below. Each sphere touches the cone along a circle (colored white), $k_1$ and $k_2$.

Denote the point of tangency of the plane with G_{1} by F_{1}, and similarly for G_{2} and F_{2} . Let P be a typical point on the curve C.

To Prove: The sum of distances $d(P,F_1) + d(P,F_2)$ remains constant as the point P moves along the intersection curve C. (This is one definition of C being an ellipse, with $F_1$ and $F_2$ being its foci.)

- A line passing through P and the vertex S of the cone intersects the two circles, touching G_{1} and G_{2} respectively at points P_{1} and P_{2}.
- As P moves around the curve, P_{1} and P_{2} move along the two circles, and their distance d(P_{1}, P_{2}) remains constant.
- The distance from P to F_{1} is the same as the distance from P to P_{1}, because the line segments PF_{1} and PP_{1} are both tangent to the same sphere G_{1}.
- By a symmetrical argument, the distance from P to F_{2} is the same as the distance from P to P_{2}.
- Consequently, we compute the sum of distances as $d(P,F_1) + d(P,F_2) \ =\ d(P,P_1) + d(P,P_2) \ =\ d(P_1,P_2),$ which is constant as P moves along the curve.

This gives a different proof of a theorem of Apollonius of Perga.

If we define an ellipse to mean the locus of points P such that d(F_{1}, P) + d(F_{2}, P) = a constant, then the above argument proves that the intersection curve C is indeed an ellipse. That the intersection of the plane with the cone is symmetric about the perpendicular bisector of the line through F_{1} and F_{2} may be counterintuitive, but this argument makes it clear.

Cylinder case

Adaptations of this argument work for hyperbolas and parabolas as intersections of a plane with a cone. Another adaptation works for an ellipse realized as the intersection of a plane with a right circular cylinder.

== Proof of the focus-directrix property ==
The directrix of a conic section can be found using Dandelin's construction. Each Dandelin sphere intersects the cone at a circle; let both of these circles define their own planes. The intersections of these two parallel planes with the conic section's plane will be two parallel lines; these lines are the directrices of the conic section. However, a parabola has only one Dandelin sphere, and thus has only one directrix.

Using the Dandelin spheres, it's possible to conduct a proof for the parabola, that it is the locus of points for which the distance from a point (focus) is the same as the distance from the directrix, as well as a more general proof that any conic section is the locus of points where the distances maintain a constant proportion. Ancient Greek mathematicians such as Pappus of Alexandria were aware of this property, but the Dandelin spheres facilitate the proof.

Neither Dandelin nor Quetelet used the Dandelin spheres to prove the focus-directrix property. The first to do so may have been Pierce Morton in 1829, or perhaps Hugh Hamilton who remarked (in 1758) that a sphere touches the cone at a circle which defines a plane whose intersection with the plane of the conic section is a directrix. The focus-directrix property can be used to prove that astronomical objects move along conic sections around the Sun.
