= Pencil (geometry) =

Family of geometric objects with a common property

Some lines in the pencil through A

In geometry, a pencil is a family of geometric objects with a common property, for example the set of lines that pass through a given point or the set of circles that pass through two given points. The special case of a two-dimensional pencil in a plane is sometimes referred to as a flat pencil. The three-dimensional case is also called a bundle.

Although the definition of a pencil is rather vague, the common characteristic is that the pencil is defined by a parameter whose value can be determined from any two of its members. Any geometric object can be used in a pencil. The common ones are lines, planes, circles, conics, spheres, and general curves. Even points can be used: a pencil of points is the set of all points on a given line (a more common term for this set is a range of points).

== Pencil of lines ==
In a plane, let $\ell$ and $\ell'$ be two distinct intersecting lines. For concreteness, suppose that $\ell$ has the equation, $aX+bY+c=0$ and $\ell'$ has the equation $a'X+b'Y+c'=0$. Then
$$\lambda \ell+\mu \ell'=0,$$
represents, for suitable scalars $\lambda$ and $\mu$, any line passing through the intersection of $\ell=0$ and $\ell'=0$. This set of lines passing through a common point is called a pencil of lines. The common point of a pencil of lines is called the vertex of the pencil.

In an affine plane with the reflexive variant of parallelism, a set of parallel lines forms an equivalence class called a pencil of parallel lines. This terminology is consistent with the above definition since in the unique projective extension of the affine plane to a projective plane a single point (point at infinity) is added to each line in the pencil of parallel lines, thus making it a pencil in the above sense in the projective plane.

A pencil of half-lines, also called a half-pencil, is the set of half-lines sharing a common vertex. It's used in optics as a model for pencil beams.

== Pencil of planes ==
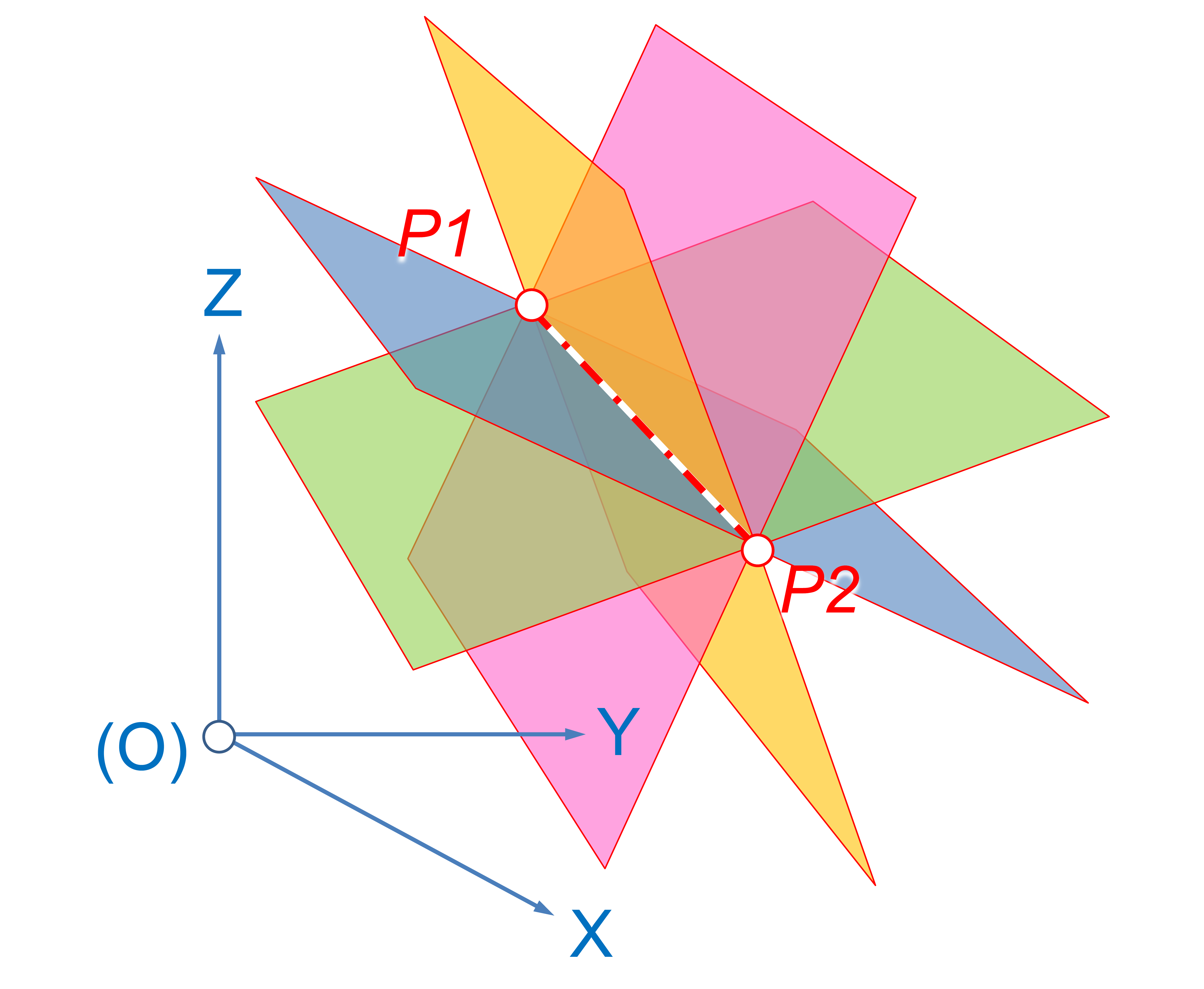
Four planes from the axial pencil on P1 P2

A pencil of planes, is the set of planes through a given straight line in three-space, called the axis of the pencil. The pencil is sometimes referred to as a axial-pencil or fan of planes or a sheaf of planes. For example, the meridians of the globe are defined by the pencil of planes on the axis of Earth's rotation.

Two intersecting planes meet in a line in three-space, and so, determine the axis and hence all of the planes in the pencil.

The four-space of quaternions $\mathbb{H}=\{a+b\, \mathbf{i} +c\, \mathbf{j} +d\, \mathbf{k}|a,b,c,d\in \mathbb{R}\}$ can be seen as an axial pencil of complex planes all sharing the same real line. In fact, quaternions contain a sphere of imaginary units, i.e., $\{b\, \mathbf{i} +c\, \mathbf{j} +d\, \mathbf{k}|(b,c,d)\in S^2\}$. And a pair of antipodal points on this sphere, together with the real axis, generate a complex plane. The union of all these complex planes constitutes the 4-algebra of quaternions.

== Pencil of circles ==
The Apollonian circles, two orthogonal pencils of circles

Any pair of circles in the plane has a radical axis, which is the line consisting of all the points that have the same power with respect to the two circles. A pencil of circles (or coaxial system) is the set of all circles in the plane with the same radical axis. To be inclusive, concentric circles are said to have the line at infinity as a radical axis.

There are five types of pencils of circles, the two families of Apollonian circles in the illustration above represent two of them. Each type is determined by two circles called the generators of the pencil. When described algebraically, it is possible that the equations may admit imaginary solutions. The types are:

- An elliptic pencil (red family of circles in the figure) is defined by two generators that pass through each other in exactly two points. Every circle of an elliptic pencil passes through the same two points. An elliptic pencil does not include any imaginary circles.
- A hyperbolic pencil (blue family of circles in the figure) is defined by two generators that do not intersect each other at any point. It includes real circles, imaginary circles, and two degenerate point circles called the Poncelet points of the pencil. Each point in the plane belongs to exactly one circle of the pencil.
- A parabolic pencil (as a limiting case) is defined where two generating circles are tangent to each other at a single point. It consists of a family of real circles, all tangent to each other at a single common point. The degenerate circle with radius zero at that point also belongs to the pencil.
- A family of concentric circles centered at a common center (may be considered a special case of a hyperbolic pencil where the other point is the point at infinity).
- The family of straight lines through a common point; these should be interpreted as circles that all pass through the point at infinity (may be considered a special case of an elliptic pencil).

=== Properties ===
A circle that is orthogonal to two fixed circles is orthogonal to every circle in the pencil they determine.

The circles orthogonal to two fixed circles form a pencil of circles.

Two circles determine two pencils, the unique pencil that contains them and the pencil of circles orthogonal to them. The radical axis of one pencil consists of the centers of the circles of the other pencil. If one pencil is of elliptic type, the other is of hyperbolic type and vice versa.

The radical axis of any pencil of circles, interpreted as an infinite-radius circle, belongs to the pencil. Any three circles belong to a common pencil whenever all three pairs share the same radical axis and their centers are collinear.

=== Projective space of circles ===
There is a natural correspondence between circles in the plane and points in three-dimensional projective space(see below); a line in this space corresponds to a one-dimensional continuous family of circles, hence a pencil of points in this space is a pencil of circles in the plane.

Specifically, the equation of a circle of radius $r$ centered at a point $(p,q)$,
$$(x-p)^2 + (y-q)^2 = r^2,$$
may be rewritten as
$$\alpha(x^2 + y^2) - 2\beta x - 2\gamma y + \delta = 0,$$
where $\alpha=1,\beta=p,\gamma=q,\delta=p^2+q^2-r^2$. In this form, multiplying the quadruple $(\alpha,\beta,\gamma,\delta)$ by a scalar produces a different quadruple that represents the same circle; thus, these quadruples may be considered to be homogeneous coordinates for the space of circles. Straight lines may also be represented with an equation of this type in which $\alpha=0$ and should be thought of as being a degenerate form of a circle. When $\alpha\neq 0$, we may solve for $p=\beta / \alpha,q=\gamma/\alpha$, and $r=\sqrt{p^2+q^2-r^2}$; the latter formula may give $r=0$ (in which case the circle degenerates to a point) or $r$ equal to an imaginary number (in which case the quadruple $(\alpha,\beta,\gamma,\delta)$ is said to represent an imaginary circle).

The set of affine combinations of two circles $(\alpha_1,\beta_1,\gamma_1,\delta_1)$, $(\alpha_2,\beta_2,\gamma_2,\delta_2)$, that is, the set of circles represented by the quadruple
$$z(\alpha_1,\beta_1,\gamma_1,\delta_1)+(1-z)(\alpha_2,\beta_2,\gamma_2,\delta_2)$$
for some value of the parameter $z$, forms a pencil; the two circles being the generators of the pencil.

=== Cardioid as envelope of a pencil of circles ===
cardioid as envelope of a pencil of circles

Another type of pencil of circles can be obtained as follows. Consider a given circle (called the generator circle) and a distinguished point P on the generator circle. The set of all circles that pass through P and have their centers on the generator circle form a pencil of circles. The envelope of this pencil is a cardioid.

== Pencil of spheres ==
A sphere is uniquely determined by four points that are not coplanar. More generally, a sphere is uniquely determined by four conditions such as passing through a point, being tangent to a plane, etc. This property is analogous to the property that three non-collinear points determine a unique circle in a plane.

Consequently, a sphere is uniquely determined by (that is, passes through) a circle and a point not in the plane of that circle.

By examining the common solutions of the equations of two spheres, it can be seen that two spheres intersect in a circle and the plane containing that circle is called the radical plane of the intersecting spheres. Although the radical plane is a real plane, the circle may be imaginary (the spheres have no real point in common) or consist of a single point (the spheres are tangent at that point).

If $f(x,y,z)=0$ and $g(x,y,z)=0$ are the equations of two distinct spheres then
$$\lambda f(x,y,z) + \mu g(x,y,z) = 0$$
is also the equation of a sphere for arbitrary values of the parameters $\lambda$ and $\mu$. The set of all spheres satisfying this equation is called a pencil of spheres determined by the original two spheres. In this definition a sphere is allowed to be a plane (infinite radius, center at infinity) and if both the original spheres are planes then all the spheres of the pencil are planes, otherwise there is only one plane (the radical plane) in the pencil.

If the pencil of spheres does not consist of all planes, then there are three types of pencils:

- If the spheres intersect in a real circle C, then the pencil consists of all the spheres containing C, including the radical plane. The centers of all the ordinary spheres in the pencil lie on a line passing through the center of C and perpendicular to the radical plane.
- If the spheres intersect in an imaginary circle, all the spheres of the pencil also pass through this imaginary circle but as ordinary spheres they are disjoint (have no real points in common). The line of centers is perpendicular to the radical plane, which is a real plane in the pencil containing the imaginary circle.
- If the spheres intersect in a point A, all the spheres in the pencil are tangent at A and the radical plane is the common tangent plane of all these spheres. The line of centers is perpendicular to the radical plane at A.

All the tangent lines from a fixed point of the radical plane to the spheres of a pencil have the same length.

The radical plane is the locus of the centers of all the spheres that are orthogonal to all the spheres in a pencil. Moreover, a sphere orthogonal to any two spheres of a pencil of spheres is orthogonal to all of them and its center lies in the radical plane of the pencil.

== Pencil of conics ==
A (non-degenerate) conic is completely determined by five points in general position (no three collinear) in a plane and the system of conics which pass through a fixed set of four points (again in a plane and no three collinear) is called a pencil of conics. The four common points are called the base points of the pencil. Through any point other than a base point, there passes a single conic of the pencil. This concept generalizes a pencil of circles.

In a projective plane defined over an algebraically closed field any two conics meet in four points (counted with multiplicity) and so, determine the pencil of conics based on these four points. Furthermore, the four base points determine three line pairs (degenerate conics through the base points, each line of the pair containing exactly two base points) and so each pencil of conics will contain at most three degenerate conics.

A pencil of conics can be represented algebraically in the following way. Let $C_1$ and $C_2$ be two distinct conics in a projective plane defined over an algebraically closed field $K$. For every pair $(\lambda,\mu)$ of elements of $K$, not both zero, the expression:
$$\lambda C_1 + \mu C_2$$
represents a conic in the pencil determined by $C_1$ and $C_2$. This symbolic representation can be made concrete with a slight abuse of notation (using the same notation to denote the object as well as the equation defining the object.) Thinking of $C_1$, say, as a ternary quadratic form, then $C_1=0$ is the equation of the "conic $C_1$". Another concrete realization would be obtained by thinking of $C_1$ as the 3×3 symmetric matrix which represents it. If $C_1$ and $C_2$ have such concrete realizations then every member of the above pencil will as well. Since the setting uses homogeneous coordinates in a projective plane, two concrete representations (either equations or matrices) give the same conic if they differ by a non-zero multiplicative constant.

== Pencil of plane curves ==
More generally, a pencil is the special case of a linear system of divisors in which the parameter space is a projective line. Typical pencils of curves in the projective plane, for example, are written as
$$\lambda C + \mu C' = 0$$

where $C=0$, $C'=0$ are plane curves.

== History ==
Girard Desargues is credited with inventing the term "pencil of lines" (ordonnance de lignes).

An early author of modern projective geometry G. B. Halsted introduced the terms copunctal and flat-pencil to define angle: "Straights with the same cross are copunctal." Also "The aggregate of all coplanar, copunctal straights is called a flat-pencil" and "A piece of a flat-pencil bounded by two of the straights as sides, is called an angle."

== See also ==
- Bundle adjustment
- Lefschetz pencil
- Matrix pencil
- Pencil beam
- Fibration
- Locus
