= Georg Glaeser =

Austrian mathematician

- Citizenship: Austria
- Education: Technical University of Vienna
- Scientific career
- Fields: Mathematics
- Workplaces: University of Applied Arts Vienna
- Doctoral advisor: Walter Wunderlich

Georg Glaeser is an Austrian mathematician, a professor for mathematics and geometry at the University of Applied Arts Vienna. He has written books on computer graphics and biology in relation to mathematics and geometry.

== Biography ==
He studied mathematics and geometry at the TU Wien from 1973 to 1978 from where he also received his doctor's degree in 1980, advised by Walter Wunderlich. After working as a teacher for mathematics and geometry at a higher technical school, he returned to university. He was visiting professor at Princeton University from 1986 to 1987 where he worked with Steve M. Slaby. In 1998 Glaeser obtained his habilitation in computer graphics at the TU Wien and became a full professor at the University of Applied Arts Vienna.

== Publications ==
- 3D-Programmierung mit Basic. Teubner, 1986.
- Objektorientiertes Graphik-Programmieren mit der Pascal Unit Supergraph. Teubner, 1992.
- Amiga 3D-Sprinter. Pearson Education, 1993.
- Glaeser, Georg (1994). Fast algorithms for 3D-graphics. New York: Springer-Verlag. ISBN 0-387-94288-2. OCLC 30034010.
- Von Pascal zu C/C++. Pearson Education, 1996.
- Glaeser, Georg (1999). Open geometry : OpenGL + advanced geometry. Hellmuth Stachel. New York: Springer. ISBN 0-387-98599-9. OCLC 39478013.
- Glaeser, Georg (2002). Handbook of geometric programming using Open Geometry GL. Hans-Peter Schröcker. New York: Springer. ISBN 0-387-22448-3. OCLC 53165549.
- Praxis der digitalen Makro- und Naturfotografie. Spektrum, 2008.
- Bilder der Mathematik. Spektrum, 2009.
- with Konrad Polthier: Bilder der Mathematik. 2. Auflage. Spektrum, 2010.
- Wie aus der Zahl ein Zebra wird. Springer Spektrum, 2010.
- Geometry and its Applications in Arts, Nature and Technology. Edition Angewandte, Springer, 2012.
- Nature and Numbers. Edition Angewandte Ambra, de Gruyter, 2014.
- Der mathematische Werkzeugkasten. Spektrum, 2004. 4. Auflage 2014.
- with Hannes F. Paulus: Die Evolution des Auges. Ein Fotoshooting. Springer Spektrum, 2014.
- with Hannes F. Paulus: The Evolution of the Eye. Springer, 2015.
- Glaeser, Georg (2016). The universe of conics : from the ancient Greeks to 21st century developments. Hellmuth Stachel and Boris Odehnal. Berlin. ISBN 978-3-662-45450-3. OCLC 945692519.
- with Hannes F. Paulus und Werner Nachtigall: Die Evolution des Fliegens. Springer Spektrum, 2017.
- Glaeser, Georg (2017). The evolution of flight. Hannes F. Paulus and Werner Nachtigall. Cham, Switzerland. ISBN 978-3-319-57024-2. OCLC 987708587.
- Glaeser, Georg (2017). Math tools : 500+ applications in science and arts. Cham, Switzerland. ISBN 978-3-319-66960-1. OCLC 1004769352.
- with Markus Roskar: Maths and Humour. De Gruyter, 2019.
- with Werner Nachtigall: The Evolution and Function of Biological Macrostructures. Springer, 2019.
- Odehnal, Boris (2020). The universe of quadrics. Hellmuth Stachel, Georg Glaeser. Berlin, Germany. ISBN 978-3-662-61053-4. OCLC 1152063617.
- Glaeser, Georg (2020). Geometry and its applications in arts, nature and technology (Second ed.). Cham. ISBN 978-3-030-61398-3. OCLC 1227892836.
- 77-mal Mathematik für zwischendurch : Unterhaltsame Kuriositäten und unorthodoxe Anwendungen. Georg Glaeser (1st ed.). Berlin, Heidelberg. 2020. ISBN 978-3-662-61766-3. OCLC 1220912475.
- Glaeser, Georg (2021). Der mathematische Werkzeugkasten : Anwendungen in Natur und Technik (5th ed. 2021 ed.). Berlin, Heidelberg. ISBN 978-3-662-63261-1. OCLC 1284789321.
- Geometrie und ihre Anwendungen in Kunst, Natur und Technik. Spektrum, 2005. 3. Auflage 2015.
- Glaeser, Georg (2022). Geometrie und ihre Anwendungen in Kunst, Natur und Technik. doi:10.1007/978-3-662-64383-9. ISBN 978-3-662-64382-2. S2CID 248171364.
- Geometrie und ihre Anwendungen in Kunst, Natur und Technik. Springer-Verlag. 2014. ISBN 364241852X.
  - Geometry and its Applications in Arts, Nature and Technology. ISBN 978-3030613976
