= General position =

Concept in algebraic geometry

In algebraic geometry and computational geometry, general position is a notion of genericity for a set of points, or other geometric objects. It means the general case situation, as opposed to some more special or coincidental cases that are possible, which is referred to as special position. Its precise meaning differs in different settings.

For example, generically, two lines in the plane intersect in a single point (they are not parallel or coincident). One also says "two generic lines intersect in a point", which is formalized by the notion of a generic point. Similarly, three generic points in the plane are not collinear; if three points are collinear (even stronger, if two coincide), this is a degenerate case.

This notion is important in mathematics and its applications, because degenerate cases may require an exceptional treatment; for example, when stating general theorems or giving precise statements thereof, and when writing computer programs (see generic complexity).

== General linear position ==
A set of points in a d-dimensional affine space (d-dimensional Euclidean space is a common example) is in general linear position (or just general position) if no k of them lie in a (k − 2)-dimensional flat for k = 2, 3, ..., d + 1. These conditions contain considerable redundancy since, if the condition holds for some value k_{0} then it also must hold for all k with 2 ≤ k ≤ k_{0}. Thus, for a set containing at least d + 1 points in d-dimensional affine space to be in general position, it suffices that no hyperplane contains more than d points – i.e. the points do not satisfy any more linear relations than they must.

A set of at most d + 1 points in general linear position is also said to be affinely independent (this is the affine analog of linear independence of vectors, or more precisely of maximal rank), and d + 1 points in general linear position in affine d-space are an affine basis. See affine transformation for more.

Similarly, n vectors in an n-dimensional vector space are linearly independent if and only if the points they define in projective space (of dimension n − 1) are in general linear position.

If a set of points is not in general linear position, it is called a degenerate case or degenerate configuration, which implies that they satisfy a linear relation that need not always hold.

A fundamental application is that, in the plane, five points determine a conic, as long as the points are in general linear position (no three are collinear).

== More generally ==
This definition can be generalized further: one may speak of points in general position with respect to a fixed class of algebraic relations (e.g. conic sections). In algebraic geometry this kind of condition is frequently encountered, in that points should impose independent conditions on curves passing through them.

For example, five points determine a conic, but in general six points do not lie on a conic, so being in general position with respect to conics requires that no six points lie on a conic.

General position is preserved under biregular maps – if image points satisfy a relation, then under a biregular map this relation may be pulled back to the original points. Significantly, the Veronese map is biregular; as points under the Veronese map corresponds to evaluating a degree d polynomial at that point, this formalizes the notion that points in general position impose independent linear conditions on varieties passing through them.

The basic condition for general position is that points do not fall on subvarieties of lower degree than necessary; in the plane two points should not be coincident, three points should not fall on a line, six points should not fall on a conic, ten points should not fall on a cubic, and likewise for higher degree.

This is not sufficient, however. While nine points determine a cubic, there are configurations of nine points that are special with respect to cubics, namely the intersection of two cubics. The intersection of two cubics, which is $3 \times 3 = 9$ points (by Bézout's theorem), is special in that nine points in general position are contained in a unique cubic, while if they are contained in two cubics they in fact are contained in a pencil (1-parameter linear system) of cubics, whose equations are the projective linear combinations of the equations for the two cubics. Thus such sets of points impose one fewer condition on cubics containing them than expected, and accordingly satisfy an additional constraint, namely the Cayley–Bacharach theorem that any cubic that contains eight of the points necessarily contains the ninth. Analogous statements hold for higher degree.

For points in the plane or on an algebraic curve, the notion of general position is made algebraically precise by the notion of a regular divisor, and is measured by the vanishing of the higher sheaf cohomology groups of the associated line bundle (formally, invertible sheaf). As the terminology reflects, this is significantly more technical than the intuitive geometric picture, similar to how a formal definition of intersection number requires sophisticated algebra. This definition generalizes in higher dimensions to hypersurfaces (codimension 1 subvarieties), rather than to sets of points, and regular divisors are contrasted with superabundant divisors, as discussed in the Riemann–Roch theorem for surfaces.

Note that not all points in general position are projectively equivalent, which is a much stronger condition; for example, any k distinct points in the line are in general position, but projective transformations are only 3-transitive, with the invariant of 4 points being the cross ratio.

== Different geometries ==
Different geometries allow different notions of geometric constraints. For example, a circle is a concept that makes sense in Euclidean geometry, but not in affine linear geometry or projective geometry, where circles cannot be distinguished from ellipses, since one may squeeze a circle to an ellipse. Similarly, a parabola is a concept in affine geometry but not in projective geometry, where a parabola is simply a kind of conic. The geometry that is overwhelmingly used in algebraic geometry is projective geometry, with affine geometry finding significant but far less use.

Thus, in Euclidean geometry three non-collinear points determine a circle (as the circumcircle of the triangle they define), but four points in general do not (they do so only for cyclic quadrilaterals), so the notion of "general position with respect to circles", namely "no four points lie on a circle" makes sense. In projective geometry, by contrast, circles are not distinct from conics, and five points determine a conic, so there is no projective notion of "general position with respect to circles".

== General type ==
General position is a property of configurations of points, or more generally other subvarieties (lines in general position, so no three concurrent, and the like). General position is an extrinsic notion, which depends on an embedding as a subvariety. Informally, subvarieties are in general position if they cannot be described more simply than others. An intrinsic analog of general position is general type, and corresponds to a variety which cannot be described by simpler polynomial equations than others. This is formalized by the notion of Kodaira dimension of a variety, and by this measure projective spaces are the most special varieties, though there are other equally special ones, meaning having negative Kodaira dimension. For algebraic curves, the resulting classification is: projective line, torus, higher genus surfaces ($g \geq 2$), and similar classifications occur in higher dimensions, notably the Enriques–Kodaira classification of algebraic surfaces.

== Other contexts ==
In intersection theory, both in algebraic geometry and in geometric topology, the analogous notion of transversality is used: subvarieties in general intersect transversally, meaning with multiplicity 1, rather than being tangent or other, higher order intersections.

=== General position for Delaunay triangulations in the plane ===
When discussing Voronoi tessellations and Delaunay triangulations in the plane, a set of points in the plane is said to be in general position only if no four of them lie on the same circle and no three of them are collinear. The usual lifting transform that relates the Delaunay triangulation to the bottom half of a convex hull (i.e., giving each point p an extra coordinate equal to |p|^{2}) shows the connection to the planar view: Four points lie on a circle or three of them are collinear exactly when their lifted counterparts are not in general linear position.

== Abstractly: configuration spaces ==
In very abstract terms, general position is a discussion of generic properties of a configuration space; in this context one means properties that hold on the generic point of a configuration space, or equivalently on a Zariski-open set.

This notion coincides with the measure theoretic notion of generic, meaning almost everywhere on the configuration space, or equivalently that points chosen at random will almost surely (with probability 1) be in general position.
