= Complex conjugate line =

Operation in complex geometry

In complex geometry, the complex conjugate line of a straight line is the line that it becomes by taking the complex conjugate of each point on this line.

This is the same as taking the complex conjugates of the coefficients of the line. So if the equation of D is D: ax + by + cz = 0, then the equation of its conjugate D* is D*: a*x + b*y + c*z = 0.

The conjugate of a real line is the line itself. The intersection point of two conjugated lines is always real.
