= Veronese map =

The Veronese map of degree 2 is a mapping from $\R^{n+1}$ to the space of symmetric matrices $(n+1){\times}(n+1)$ defined by the formula:

$$V\colon(x_0,\dots,x_n)\to
\begin{pmatrix}
x_0\cdot x_0&x_0\cdot x_1&\dots&x_0\cdot x_n
\\
x_1\cdot x_0&x_1\cdot x_1&\dots&x_1\cdot x_n
\\
\vdots&\vdots&\ddots&\vdots
\\
x_n\cdot x_0&x_n\cdot x_1&\dots&x_n\cdot x_n
\end{pmatrix}.$$

Note that $V(x)=V(-x)$ for any $x\in\R^{n+1}$.

In particular, the restriction of $V$ to the unit sphere $\mathbb{S}^n$ factors through the projective space $\R\mathrm{P}^n$, which defines the Veronese embedding of $\R\mathrm{P}^n$. The image of the Veronese embedding is called the Veronese submanifold, and for $n=2$ it is known as the Veronese surface.

== Properties ==
- The matrices in the image of the Veronese embedding correspond to projections onto one-dimensional subspaces in $\R^{n+1}$. They can be described by the equations:
  $$A^T=A,\quad \mathrm{tr}\,A=1,\quad A^2=A.$$

In other words, the matrices in the image of $\R\mathrm{P}^n$ have unit trace and unit norm. Specifically, the following is true:
- The image lies in an affine space of dimension $n+\tfrac {n\cdot(n+1)}2$.
- The image lies on an $(n-1+\tfrac {n\cdot(n+1)}2)$-sphere with radius $r_n= \sqrt{1-\tfrac1{n+1}}$.
  - Moreover, the image forms a minimal submanifold in this sphere.

- The Veronese embedding induces a Riemannian metric $2\cdot g$, where $g$ denotes the canonical metric on $\R\mathrm{P}^{n-1}$.
- The Veronese embedding maps each geodesic in $\R\mathrm{P}^{n-1}$ to a circle with radius $\tfrac1{\sqrt{2}}$.
  - In particular, all the normal curvatures of the image are equal to $\sqrt{2}$.
- The Veronese manifold is extrinsically symmetric, meaning that reflection in any of its normal spaces maps the manifold onto itself.

== Variations and generalizations ==
Analogous Veronese embeddings are constructed for complex and quaternionic projective spaces, as well as for the Cayley plane.

For higher-degree Veronese maps, see Veronese surface § Veronese map.
