= Pappus configuration =

Geometric configuration of 9 points and 9 lines

Pappus configuration

In geometry, the Pappus configuration is a configuration of nine points and nine lines in the Euclidean plane, with three points per line and three lines through each point.

== History and construction ==
This configuration is named after Pappus of Alexandria. Pappus's hexagon theorem states that every two triples of collinear points ABC and abc (none of which lie on the intersection of the two lines) can be completed to form a Pappus configuration, by adding the six lines A̅b̅, a̅B̅, A̅c̅, a̅C̅, B̅c̅, and b̅C̅, and their three intersection points X = A̅b̅ · a̅B̅, Y = A̅c̅ · a̅C̅, and Z = B̅c̅ · b̅C̅. These three points are the intersection points of the "opposite" sides of the hexagon AbCaBc. According to Pappus' theorem, the resulting system of nine points and eight lines always has a ninth line containing the three intersection points X, Y, and Z, called the Pappus line.

The Pappus configuration from perspective triangles △XcC and △YbB

The Pappus configuration can also be derived from two triangles △XcC and △YbB that are in perspective with each other (the three lines through corresponding pairs of points meet at a single crossing point) in three different ways, together with their three centers of perspectivity Z, a, and A. The points of the configuration are the points of the triangles and centers of perspectivity, and the lines of the configuration are the lines through corresponding pairs of points.

== Related constructions ==
The Pappus graph with bipartite coloring

The Levi graph of the Pappus configuration is known as the Pappus graph. It is a bipartite symmetric cubic graph with 18 vertices and 27 edges.

Adding three more parallel lines to the Pappus configuration, through each triple of points that are not already connected by lines of the configuration, produces the Hesse configuration.

Like the Pappus configuration, the Desargues configuration can be defined in terms of perspective triangles, and the Reye configuration can be defined analogously from two tetrahedra that are in perspective with each other in four different ways, forming a desmic system of tetrahedra.

For any nonsingular cubic plane curve in the Euclidean plane, three real inflection points of the curve, and a fourth point on the curve, there is a unique way of completing these four points to form a Pappus configuration in such a way that all nine points lie on the curve.

== Applications ==
The Pappus configuration, augmented with an additional line (the vertical one in the center of the figure), solves the orchard-planting problem for 9 points, with 3 points per line.

A variant of the Pappus configuration provides a solution to the orchard-planting problem, the problem of finding sets of points that have the largest possible number of lines through three points. The nine points of the Pappus configuration form only nine three-point lines. However, they can be arranged so that there is another three-point line, making a total of ten. This is the maximum possible number of three-point lines through nine points.
