= Perspective geological correlation =

Theory in Earth sciences

Geological perspective correlation is a theory in geology describing geometrical regularities in the layering of sediments. Seventy percent of the Earth's surface are occupied by sedimentary basins – volumes consisted of sediments accumulated during million years, and alternated by long interruptions in sedimentation (hiatuses). The most noticeable feature of the rocks, which filled the basins, is layering (stratification). Stratigraphy is a part of Geology that investigates the phenomenon of layering. It describes the sequence of layers in the basin as consisted of stratigraphic units. Units are defined on the basis of their lithology and have no clear definition. Geological Perspective Correlation (GPC) is a theory that divided the geological cross-section in units according strong mathematical rule: all borders of layers in this unit obey the law of perspective geometry.

Sedimentation layers are mainly created in shallow waters of oceans, seas, and lakes. As new layers are deposited the old ones are sinking deeper due to the weight of accumulating sediments. The content of sedimentary layers (lithological and biological), their order in the sequence, and geometrical characteristics keep records of the history of the Earth, of past climate, sea-level and environment. Most knowledge about the sedimentary basins came from exploration drilling when searching for oil and gas. The essential feature of this information is that each layer is penetrated by the wells in a number of scattered locations. This raises the problem of identifying each layer in all wells – the geological correlation problem The identification is based on comparison of 1) physical and mineralogical characteristics of the particular layer (lithostratigraphy), or 2) petrified remnants in this layer (biostratigraphy). The similarity of layers is decreasing as the distance between the cross-sections increases that leads to ambiguity of the correlation scheme that indicates which layers penetrated at different locations belong to the same body (see A). To improve the results geologists take in consideration the spatial relations between layers, which restricted the number of acceptable correlations. The first restriction was formulated in XVII century: the sequence of layers is the same in any cross-section. The second one was discovered by Haites in 1963: In an undisturbed sequence of layers (strata) the thicknesses (H1 and H2) of any layer observed in two different locations obey the law of perspective geometry, i.e. the perspective ratio K = H1/H2 is the same for all layers in this succession. This theory attracted attention around the world., and particularly in Russia The theory is also a basis of the method of graphical correlation in biostratigraphy widely used in oil and coal industries.

== Overview ==
Anticlinal trap. The porous layer is saturated with water, oil, and gas

The geometry is the main lead to natural resources exploration.

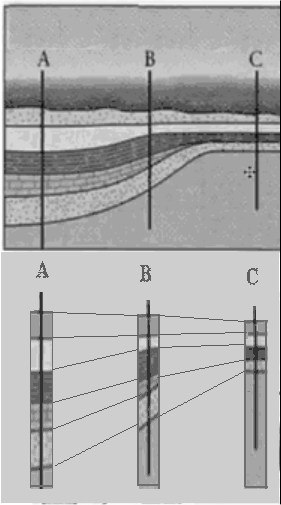
(A) Correlation scheme indicates which layers penetrated at different locations belong to the same body

For example, the oil geologists are looking for permeable layers of particular geometry, which allows keeping the oil in place (for instance, the domed shape anticlinal trap). The ore geologists are looking for faults in the sediments – the ways, which deliver the melted mantle materials to the upper crust. Knowledge about underground geometry of the sedimentary basins comes from geological observations, geophysical measurements and from drilling. Drilling gives the most detailed information about the position, thickness, physical, chemical and biological characteristics of each layer, but the point is that each well presents all this information in one location on the layer. Because the geometry of a layer can be very complicated it becomes a difficult problem and requires a significant number of drilled wells. The challenge is identifying in each well the interval that belongs to the same layer now or in the past (see A). To do this geologists use all available characteristics of the layer. Only after this it is possible to begin the recovery of the geometry of the layer (to be more precise – the geometry of the top and bottom surfaces of the layer). This procedure is called geological correlation, and the results are presented as acorrelation scheme (A). It is natural that at the beginning of the exploration, when the number of wells is small, the correlation scheme contains expensive mistakes.

== Basics of geological correlation ==
The Danish scientist Nicolas Steno (1638–1686) is credited with three principles of sedimentation

1. superposition: in undeformed stratigraphic sequences the oldest strata will be at the bottom of the succession,
2. original horizontality: layers of sediment are originally deposited horizontally,
3. lateral continuity: layers of sediments initially extend laterally in all directions.

The principles 1 allows defining the temporary relations between neighboring geological bodies, the principle 2 organizes the geometrical pattern of the succession of layers, the principle 3 helps uniting the parts of the layer found in separated geological cross-sections. Practical correlation has a lot of difficulties: fuzzy borders of the layers, variations in composition and structure of the rocks in the layer, unconformities in the sequence of layers, etc. This is why errors in correlation schemes are not seldom. When the distances between available cross-sections are decreasing (for example, by drilling new wells) the quality of correlation is improving, but meanwhile the wrong geological decisions could be made that increases the expenses of geological projects. From Steno's principle of initial horizontality follows that the top borders of the layers (tops) were initially flat, and remained flat until the complete succession stays undisturbed by subsequent tectonic movements, but no regularities about the geometric relations between these flat surfaces in the succession were known. The first to shed light on the problem was Canadian geologist Binner Heites: in 1963 he published the Geological Perspective Correlation hypothesis. Perspective geological correlation is a theory that establishes strong geometrical restrictions on the geometry of the layers in sedimentary deposits.

== Perspective geometry in undisturbed succession of layers ==
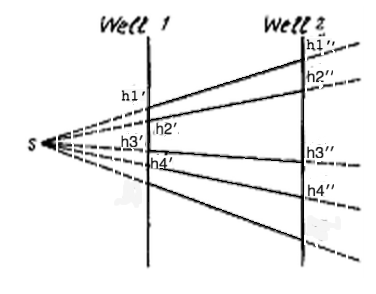
(B) Heites' perspective correlation

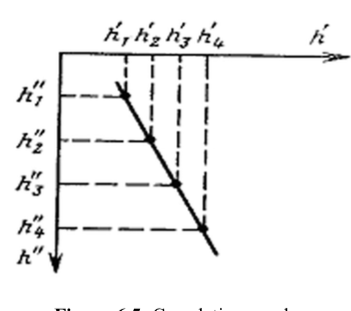
(C) Correlation plot

In 1963 the Canadian geologist Binner Heites discovered a strong regularity of the layering in sedimentary basins: the thicknesses of layers within each stratigraphic unit are governed by the law of perspective correspondence. It means that in undisturbed succession on the correlation scheme the straight lines drawn through the border points of the same layer in two cross-sections intersect in one point – center of perspectivity (see B). For geological purposes more convenient geometrical presentation of perspective relations is the correlation plot proposed by Jekhowsky (see C): the depths of the layer's borders in one geologic cross-section are plotted along axis h′ (h1′, h2′, h3′,...), and the position of the same layers in another cross-section are plotted along axis h′′ (h1′′, h2′′, h3′′, ...). Points 1, 2, 3 ... with coordinates (h1′, h1′′), (h2′, h2′′), and (h3′, h3′′), accordingly, are called correlation points, and a curve drawn through these points, a correlation line. Black dots (connectors) represent the relative position of correlated borders on the plot. When the layers geometry satisfies the conditions of perspective correspondence the correlation line is a straight line. In the particular case of parallel layers the inclination of the correlation line is 45^{0}. The Perspective Geological Correlation also states that

1. each sedimentary basin consists of a number of stratigraphic units (sequence of layers without unconformities), and
2. in each unit the relations between the thicknesses of the layers in two cross-sections satisfy the perspective geometry conditions with individual ratios K.

Heites also concludes that all strata in each unit were governed by the same rate of deposition, and their borders are synchronous time-planes. Each layer has different thicknesses in different locations, but they lasted equally long. It was a significant input in chronostratigraphy.

The following are consequences of the basic statements:

1. In different stratigraphic horizons the slopes of the correlation lines are different.
2. If two adjacent sections have the same slope then both sections belong to the same stratigraphic horizon. The gap between the lines indicates a fault.
3. If on the correlation line that presents the undisturbed stratigraphic succession one correlation point doesn't fit the line it means that:
  1. the correlation of the tops of the corresponding layer is wrong, or
  2. lithologic replacement.

== Connections to traditional lithostratigraphy ==
The Perspective Geological Correlation is well grounded in traditional geology. The method of convergence maps serves for determining the structure of the layer based on the known structure of the layers lying above. It is based on the assumption that the layers are close to parallel. Convergence map shows lines of equal distance (isopach lines) between key layer and target layer. If the layers are parallel the distance between these layers is constant, the structures of both layers are identical, and to determine depths of the target horizon it is enough to get only one deep well, which reached the target layer. But in reality such conditions are extremely rare. In reality restoring the geometry of the target horizon demands a number of deep wells in the area. In this case the standard procedure for calculating the distance between the target layer and key layer in any point in the area is linear interpolation between the known wells. The reliability of the result (the geometrical structure of the target horizon) is estimated by the analysis of the trend of the distances between key horizon and target horizon (isopachs): if the trend is regular, for example, the distances are monotonically changing in one direction, it is a sign of reliability of the reconstruction. In the simplest case the surface of the target horizon is a plain in general position, and the linear interpolation gives the correct result. The assumptions of the convergence method are consequences of the perspective correlations theory, so, the method obtains the theoretical background. The theory also gave an additional criteria for the validity of the reconstructed surface. It defines the stratigraphic interval where layers were deposited without interruption, and where the layers' thicknesses satisfy the law of perspective geometry. The convergence maps deliver the correct result only when the layers belong to such stratigraphic unit.

== Testing ==
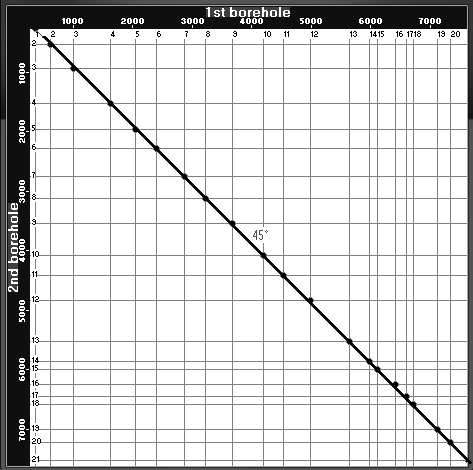
(D) Correlation plot for two cross-sections in Innisfail field (Alberta. Canada) 6 km in thickness—no unconformities

The description of the theory was supported by a number of cases in support of the theory.

1. The plot (D) shows the correlation plot for two wells in Alberta (Canada): Innisfail 15-8-35-1W5 and Innisfail 7-33-25-lW5. The cross-section of Innisfail field contains a middle Proterozoic to Paleocene sedimentary succession in excess of 6 km in thickness. The graph shows that the relations between thicknesses of all corresponding layers in these two cross-sections are located on the straight line, i.e. submit to the law of geometrical perspective with the same perspective ratio K. The markers are from conventional correlation scheme. The deviation of the correlation points from the straight line is about five feet on average.
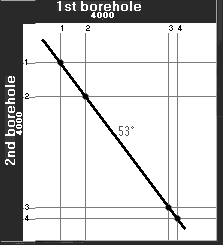
  (E) Correlation between two wells 300 miles apart—Saskatchewan and Manitoba (Canada)
  .
1. The plot (E) demonstrates that Perspective Geological Correlation works at long distances as well. The plot shows the correlation between two wells in Canada 300 miles apart (Saskatchewan and Manitoba) in Silur-Ordovician carbonates (the tilt angle 53^{0} corresponds to K = 1.6).

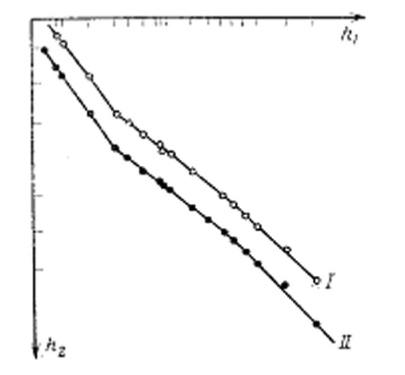
(F) Correlation plot: Volga-Ural province. I – wells #3 (Krym-Saray) and #97 (Suleyevo), 70 km apart; II – wells #3 (Krym-Saray) and #21 (Oktyabr'skaya), 25 km apart.

The first review of Heites' publication appeared at 1964 in Russia. It describes in the details the hypothesis and estimates very high its potential. The idea attracted the programmers working on automation of correlation on computers: the known rules of correlation were fuzzy, and it was impossible to formalize them and transform them into algorithms. The restrictions of the geometry of layering observed by Heites allowed compensating the lack of nonformal human knowledge.

A group of Russian scientists (Guberman, Ovchinnikova, Maximov) positively tested Heites' hypothesis in different oil-bearing province using the computer program (in Central Asia, Volga-Ural province, West and East Siberia, and Russian Platform). For example, see plot (F). The activity of this group continued in 2000th, and covers new geological provinces around the globe Canada, Kansas, Louisiana, South Welsh. O. Karpenko demonstrated an effective use of perspective correlation in resolving very practical problems of oil exploration. The law of perspective accordance allowed to discover the boundaries of changing the paleotectonic regime in the thin-layered sedimentary rocks, while the regular correlation technic didn't work. At the example of Rubanivsk gas field author demonstrated that the Dashava deposits of Precarpathian External Zone depression can be divided into number of zones of stable sediment accumulation in different conditions. Some zones correlate with the intervals of enhanced gas flow rate.

These works show that

1. the hypothesis is correct in the wide variety of geological conditions,
2. it works at long distances,
3. it can serve as a solid test for stratigraphic schemes made by geologists,
4. it reviles the unconformity of layers as small as 1° (G–I), and faults with the amplitude of displacement as small as 1–2 m (G–II),
5. the number of correctly correlated tops in the stratigraphic unit without unconformities has to be not less than three, and as bigger is this number the bigger is the reliability of the result,
6. it is an instrument for correcting the mistakes.
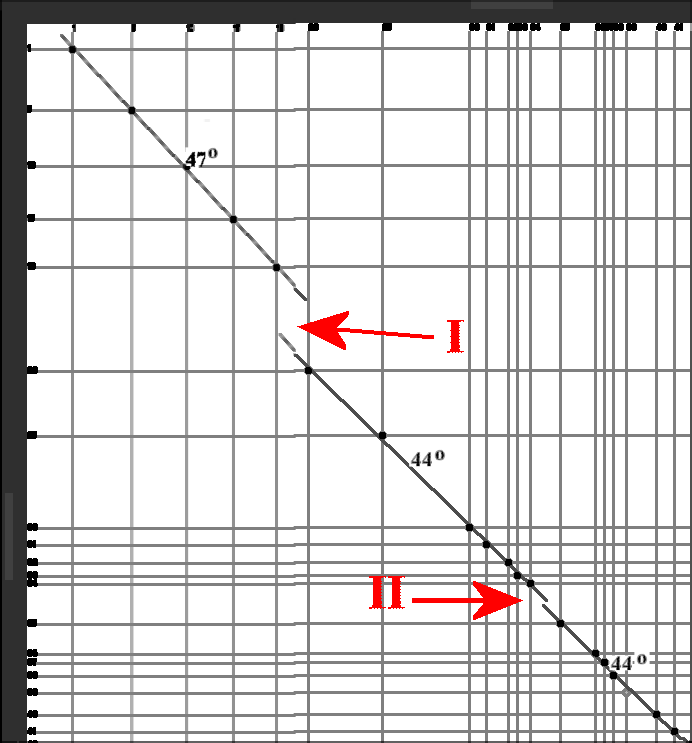
  (G) I – Unconformity (the inclinations of LOC are different – 47° and 44°) and II – Fault (both inclinations are equal 44°)

Since the publication of Heites' theory in 1963 it was republished in a number of reviews on quantitative methods of correlation (including automatic correlation). Some of the reports (Hansen, Salin, Barinova) demonstrate that the perspective correlation allowed to achieve better reconstruction of the geological structure at the early stages of geological exploration. Hansen describes the controversial history of investigating the complicated Patapsco formation in Maryland and Virginia (USA), and claims that “an adaptation of Heites' (1963) technique of perspective correlation is used to subdivide the Patapsco Formation into consistently defied mapping units”. Salin was able to simplify the stratigraphic description of Khatyr depression (Siberia) by applying perspective correlation. Barinova analysed the structure of Osipovichy gas underground storage (East Europe)) by automatic correlation program based on Heites' principles. Because of the high resolving power of the method it was recognized the existence of a number of geological faults that break the leakproofness. Because of small displacements of the faults they were not found by the traditional methods of correlation, and rejected by the geological service of the project. Very soon after the storage started functioning significant leakage of gas was recognized

== Extension to biostratigraphy ==
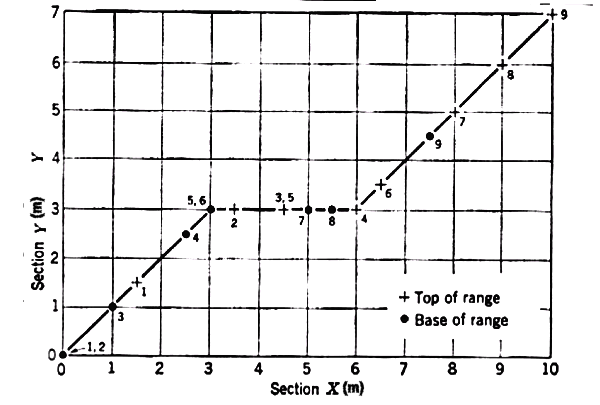
H Ideal Line of Correlation

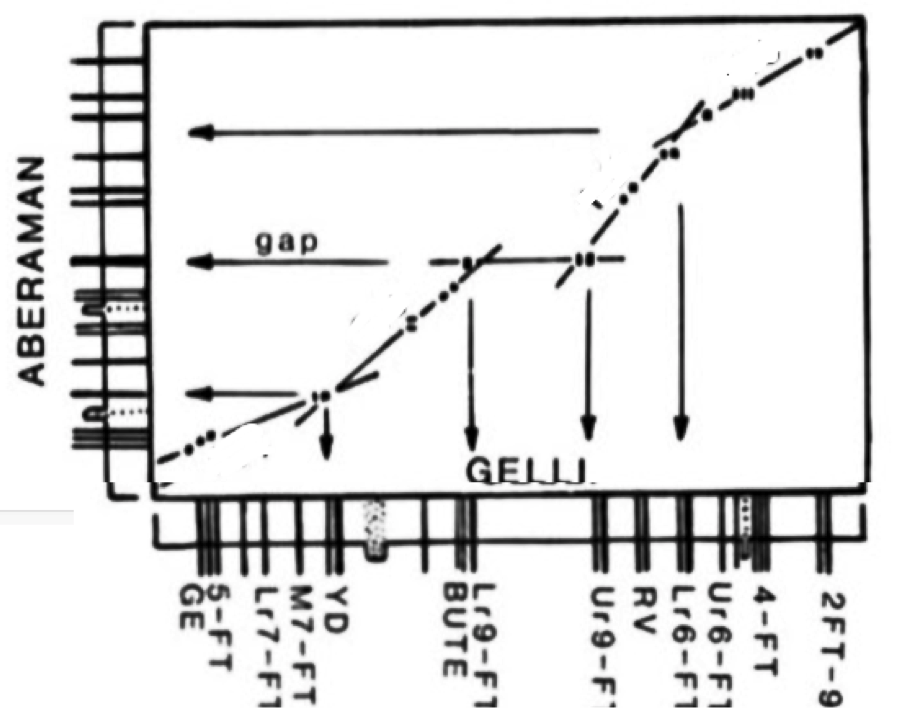
(I) The Correlation plot in coal deposits (Aberaman and Gelli ptofiles, South Wales Basin). All four tilts of the linear segments are different, which indicates on three unconformities

In 1964 Shaw proposed the method of correlating fossiliferous stratigraphic profiles using the two-axis graph (H). The markers on each axis are the observed depths of lowest (FAD) and highest (LAD) occurrences of a specially defined group of fossils (taxa). The appearances/ disappearances of taxa are regarded as synchronous and used as markers of correlation. When projected on a graph, the corresponding points of two compared profiles form the Line of Correlation (LOC). Shaw showed that the ideal LOC consists of linear segments (H). Such conditions occur when the number of collected fossils is big, and one can be sure that the material covers the complete range of fossils appearance, and FADs and LADs can be accurately determined. In the reality, some sampled ranges will be shorter than true ranges, and this can disturb the linearity of the LOC.

In every stratigraphic interval correlated ends of the range (FAD or LAD) belong to the same time surface, and in each geological cross-section (well or outcrop) this interval has identical duration but different thickness. It means that accumulation rates (thickness-to-duration ratio = tg β) are different in different locations. From the fact that the relation of durations of the units and their thicknesses are linear follows that in the limits of the linear section of LOC all strata have the same accumulation rate.

The reliability and accuracy of Shaw's method have been tested by Edwards, using a computer simulation on hypothetical data sets, and by Rubel and Pak in terms of the formal logic and stochastic theory.

The graphical correlation became a very important tool of stratigraphy in coal and oil industries.

In 1988 Nemec showed the equivalence of Haites' perspective correlation, and Shaw's graphical correlation

== Sedimentation model ==
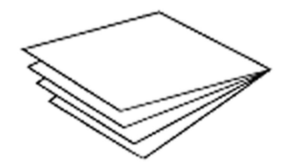
(K) Position of layers in undisturbed sequence of layers

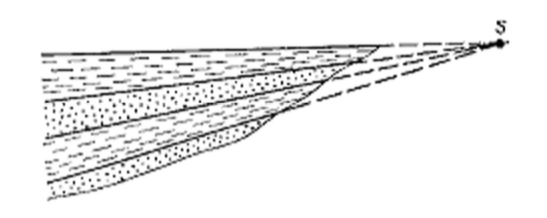
(L) The axis of rotation is located far onshore

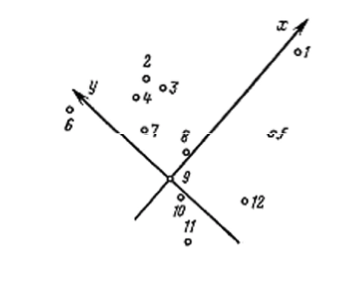
(M) Forecasting the thickness of the stratigraphic unit on remote distances

Based on the theory of perspective correlation in 1986 S. Guberman proposed a model of the process of sedimentation According Haites’ theory in the given sedimentary basin in each stratigraphic unit the condition of perspective correspondence are satisfied in any pair of wells. From this follows that the tops and bases of the layers in this stratigraphic unit satisfy the conditions of perspective correspondence in 3D space (K). Any three points of a plane define the complete plane. It means that if in three wells the thicknesses of layers belonging to the same stratigraphic unit are known, then the thicknesses of these layers can be calculated for any location in the basin. Accordingly, if the structure of the top border of the stratigraphic unit is known, the structure of any other border in this unit can be calculated.

The model of creating such sophisticated geometrical pattern is based on the first Steno's principle: the strata are originally horizontal, i.e. are planes. It occurs in the shallow waters due to the turbulence of the undersurface layer of water. The second Steno's principle, which indicates the creation of a series of sedimentary layers lying on top of each others, supposes the subsidence of the basin. The sinking of the basin follows the strong geometrical restrictions: the tectonic bloc, which carry the basin, is rotating around the straight line parallel to the water surface, and located onshore (L). As a result, until the moment of main tectonic disturbance all borders of the layers remain flat and the geometrical inter-relations are described as perspective correspondence. In the future the tectonic movements will distort the shape of the layers – the borders will no more be planes, but in majority of cases the changes are smooth and the perspective relations are maintained.

This model allows specifying some geological terms. Steno's horizontality principle has to state: the top surface of the sediments is horizontal. The conformity is a fundamental notion in stratigraphy. Until now this term is used in two different meanings: a surface between two stratigraphic sequences, and the relationship between two stratigraphic units. Sometimes both were used in the same paragraph (see, page 84).Perspective correlation principle allows to define the notion of conformity: sequence of layers that obey the conditions of geometrical perspective is a unit of conformity. Two neighboring units of conformity are in relation of unconformity.

Here is an example that shows that the borders of undisturbed stratigraphic unit in the Middle Carboniferous (Volga-Ural oil province, Russia) initially were plains. In the central part of the area (about 100 km in diameter) were chosen three wells at distances of 10 – 15 km.. The three tops of the stratigraphic unit in the three wells are points in 3D space with coordinates x, y, z, where x and y are present the position of the well on the surface (M), and z is the thickness of the stratigraphic unit in this location. They determine the top plain of the unit as it was at the time of its creation. The three bases determine the bottom plane of the unit at it was at the same time. This allowed calculating the thickness of the stratigraphic unit at any point in the area. Because the area was well enough drilled the calculated numbers can be compared with the real numbers. The average difference equals 2%.
