= Miquel configuration =

In geometry, the Miquel configuration is a configuration of eight points and six circles in the Euclidean plane, (8_{3} 6_{4}), with four points per circle and three circles through each point.

== In two dimensions ==
Its Levi graph is the rhombic dodecahedral graph, the skeleton of the rhombic dodecahedron. The configuration is related to Miquel's theorem.

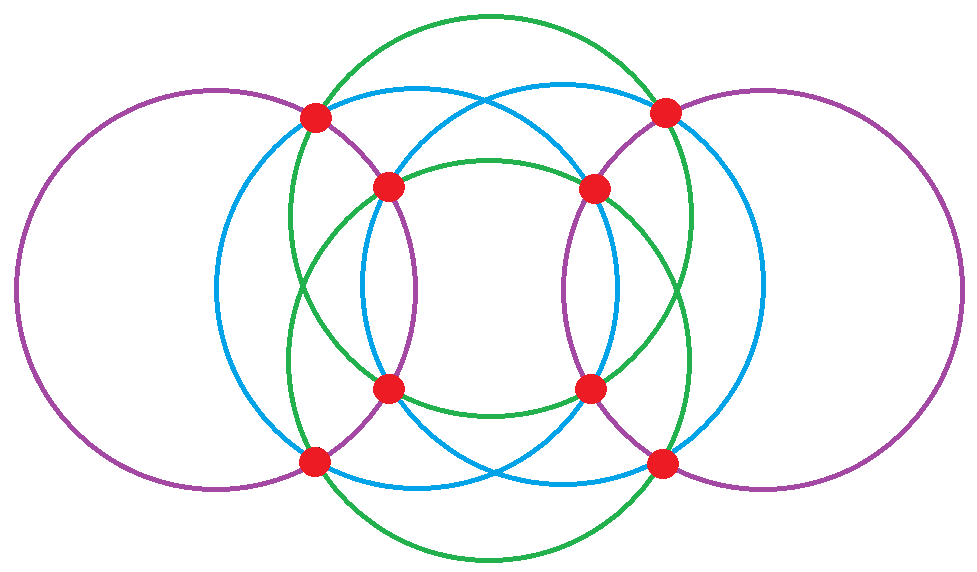
The Miquel configuration drawn with equal diameter circles

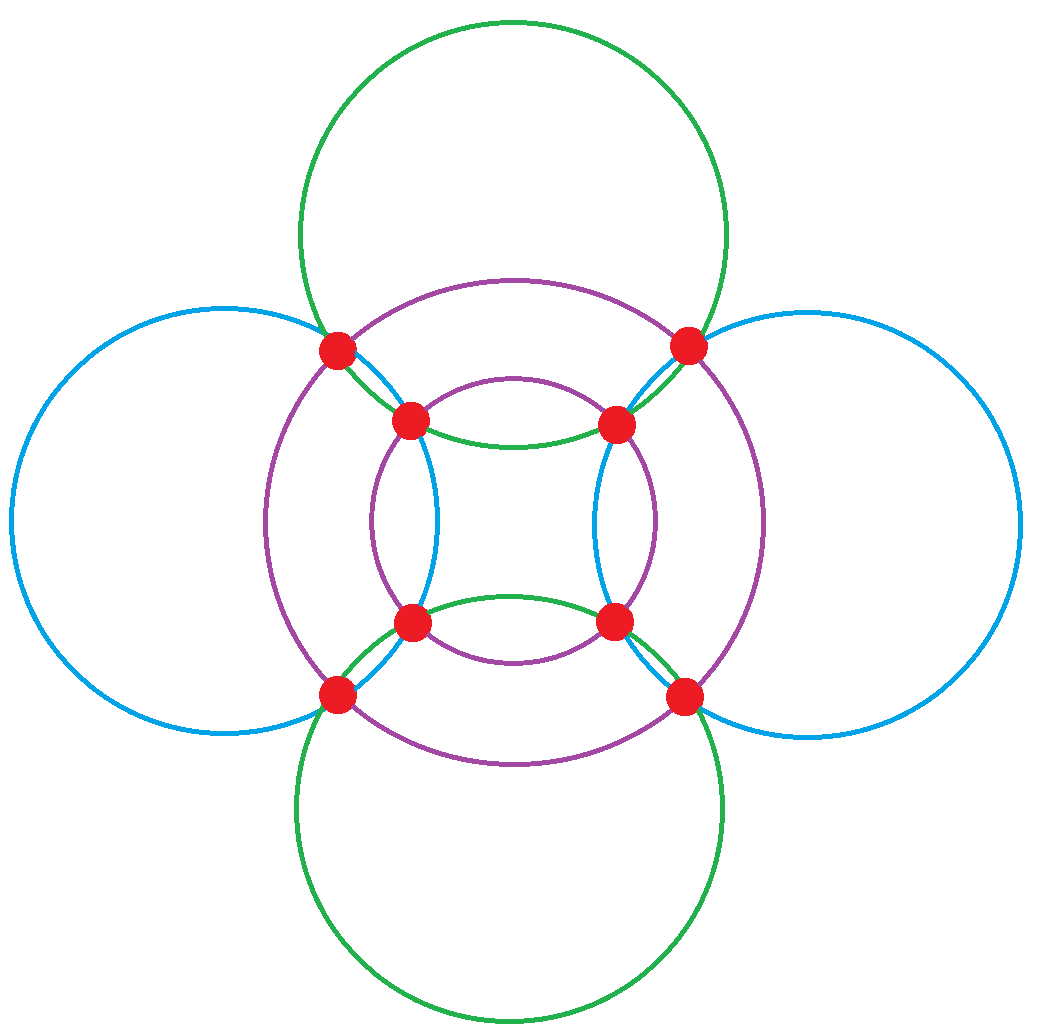
The configuration drawn with square symmetry

The Levi graph of the Miquel configuration. 6 blue vertices from circles, and 8 red vertices from points.

== In three dimensions ==
The configuration has maximal symmetry in 3-dimension, and can be seen as 6 circles circumscribe the square faces of a cube. It has 12 sets of pairwise circle intersections, corresponding to the edges of the cube and octahedron. Structurally it has 48 automorphisms of octahedral symmetry.

If two opposite circles are removed the configuration becomes (8_{2} 4_{2}), with 128 automorphisms (4 rotations by 2^{3} pair interchanges)

A different (8_{3} 6_{4}) can be found as with 6 central circles on a cube. The circles are on the 6 mirror planes of tetrahedral symmetry. In full it has 384 automorphisms of hyperoctahedral symmetry as the maximal geometric symmetry can be seen in 6, C(4,2), orthogonal circles as central squares in a 16-cell.

Related point-circle configurations
Miquel 6-circle	Reduced 4-circle	Reduced & doubled 8-circle	Miquel+Central 12-circle	Central 6-circle
(8_{3} 6_{4})	(8_{2} 4_{4})	(8_{4})	(8_{6} 12_{4})	(8_{3} 6_{4})
48 Aut (3!×2^{3})	128 Aut (4×2^{3})	192 Aut (4!×2^{3})		384 Aut (4!×2^{4})
6 circles 8 vertices of cube	4 circles on 8 vertices of cube	8 circles (4 central) on 8 vertices of cube	12 circles (6 central) on 8 vertices of cube	6 central circles on 8 vertices on a cube

== Dual configuration ==
The dual configuration (6_{4} 8_{3}) can be drawn with the 6 vertices of an octahedron and the 8 circles circumscribe the 8 triangular faces.

Taking half of the circles makes (6_{2} 4_{3}) with tetrahedral symmetry and 24 automorphisms. This is isomorphic to the point-line configuration complete quadrilateral.

Three central circles can also go through the same 6 vertices, and can be seen as square faces in the tetrahemihexahedron.

Related dual point-circle configurations
Dual 8-circles	Half 4-circle	Central 3-circle
48 Aut (3!×2^{3})	24 Aut	48 Aut
(6_{4} 8_{3})	(6_{2} 4_{3})	(6_{2} 3_{4})
8 circles on 6 vertices of octahedron	4 circles on 6 vertices of octahedron	3 central circles on 6 vertices of octahedron
