= Theodor Reye =

German mathematician

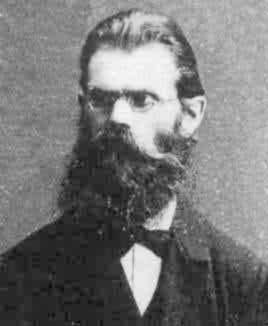
Theodor Reye

Karl Theodor Reye (born 20 June 1838 in Ritzebüttel, Germany and died 2 July 1919 in Würzburg, Germany) was a German mathematician. He contributed to geometry, particularly projective geometry and synthetic geometry. He is best known for his introduction of configurations in the second edition of his book, Geometrie der Lage (Geometry of Position, 1876). The Reye configuration of 12 points, 12 planes, and 16 lines is named after him.

Reye also developed a novel solution to the following three-dimensional extension of the problem of Apollonius: Construct all possible spheres that are simultaneously tangent to four given spheres.

== Life ==
Reye obtained his Ph.D. from the University of Göttingen in 1861. His dissertation was entitled "Die mechanische Wärme-Theorie und das Spannungsgesetz der Gase" (The mechanical theory of heat and the potential law of gases).

== Mathematical work ==
Reye worked on conic sections, quadrics and projective geometry.

Reye's work on linear manifolds of projective plane pencils and of bundles on spheres influenced later work by Corrado Segre on manifolds. He introduced Reye congruences, the earliest examples of Enriques surfaces.
