= Perspectivity =

In geometry and in its applications to drawing, a perspectivity is the formation of an image in a picture plane of a scene viewed from a fixed point.

== Graphics ==
The science of graphical perspective uses perspectivities to make realistic images in proper proportion. According to Kirsti Andersen, the first author to describe perspectivity was Leon Alberti in his De Pictura (1435). In English, Brook Taylor presented his Linear Perspective in 1715, where he explained "Perspective is the Art of drawing on a Plane the Appearances of any Figures, by the Rules of Geometry". In a second book, New Principles of Linear Perspective (1719), Taylor wrote

When Lines drawn according to a certain Law from the several Parts of any Figure, cut a Plane, and by that Cutting or Intersection describe a figure on that Plane, that Figure so described is called the Projection of the other Figure. The Lines producing that Projection, taken all together, are called the System of Rays. And when those Rays all pass thro’ one and same Point, they are called the Cone of Rays. And when that Point is consider’d as the Eye of a Spectator, that System of Rays is called the Optic Cone

== Projective geometry ==
A perspectivity: $ABCD \doublebarwedge A'B'C'D',$

In projective geometry the points of a line are called a projective range, and the set of lines in a plane on a point is called a pencil.

Given two lines $\ell$ and $m$ in a projective plane and a point P of that plane on neither line, the bijective mapping between the points of the range of $\ell$ and the range of $m$ determined by the lines of the pencil on P is called a perspectivity (or more precisely, a central perspectivity with center P). A special symbol has been used to show that points X and Y are related by a perspectivity; $X \doublebarwedge Y .$ In this notation, to show that the center of perspectivity is P, write $X \ \overset {P}{\doublebarwedge} \ Y.$

The existence of a perspectivity means that corresponding points are in perspective. The dual concept, axial perspectivity, is the correspondence between the lines of two pencils determined by a projective range.

=== Projectivity ===
The composition of two perspectivities is, in general, not a perspectivity. A perspectivity or a composition of two or more perspectivities is called a projectivity (projective transformation, projective collineation and homography are synonyms).

There are several results concerning projectivities and perspectivities which hold in any pappian projective plane:

Theorem: Any projectivity between two distinct projective ranges can be written as the composition of no more than two perspectivities.

Theorem: Any projectivity from a projective range to itself can be written as the composition of three perspectivities.

Theorem: A projectivity between two distinct projective ranges which fixes a point is a perspectivity.

=== Higher-dimensional perspectivities ===
The bijective correspondence between points on two lines in a plane determined by a point of that plane not on either line has higher-dimensional analogues which will also be called perspectivities.

Let S_{m} and T_{m} be two distinct m-dimensional projective spaces contained in an n-dimensional projective space R_{n}. Let P_{n−m−1} be an (n − m − 1)-dimensional subspace of R_{n} with no points in common with either S_{m} or T_{m}. For each point X of S_{m}, the space L spanned by X and P_{n-m-1} meets T_{m} in a point Y = f_{P}(X). This correspondence f_{P} is also called a perspectivity. The central perspectivity described above is the case with n = 2 and m = 1.

=== Perspective collineations ===
Let S_{2} and T_{2} be two distinct projective planes in a projective 3-space R_{3}. With O and O* being points of R_{3} in neither plane, use the construction of the last section to project S_{2} onto T_{2} by the perspectivity with center O followed by the projection of T_{2} back onto S_{2} with the perspectivity with center O*. This composition is a bijective map of the points of S_{2} onto itself which preserves collinear points and is called a perspective collineation (central collineation in more modern terminology). Let φ be a perspective collineation of S_{2}. Each point of the line of intersection of S_{2} and T_{2} will be fixed by φ and this line is called the axis of φ. Let point P be the intersection of line OO* with the plane S_{2}. P is also fixed by φ and every line of S_{2} that passes through P is stabilized by φ (fixed, but not necessarily pointwise fixed). P is called the center of φ. The restriction of φ to any line of S_{2} not passing through P is the central perspectivity in S_{2} with center P between that line and the line which is its image under φ.

== See also ==
- Perspective projection
- Desargues's theorem

== Notes ==
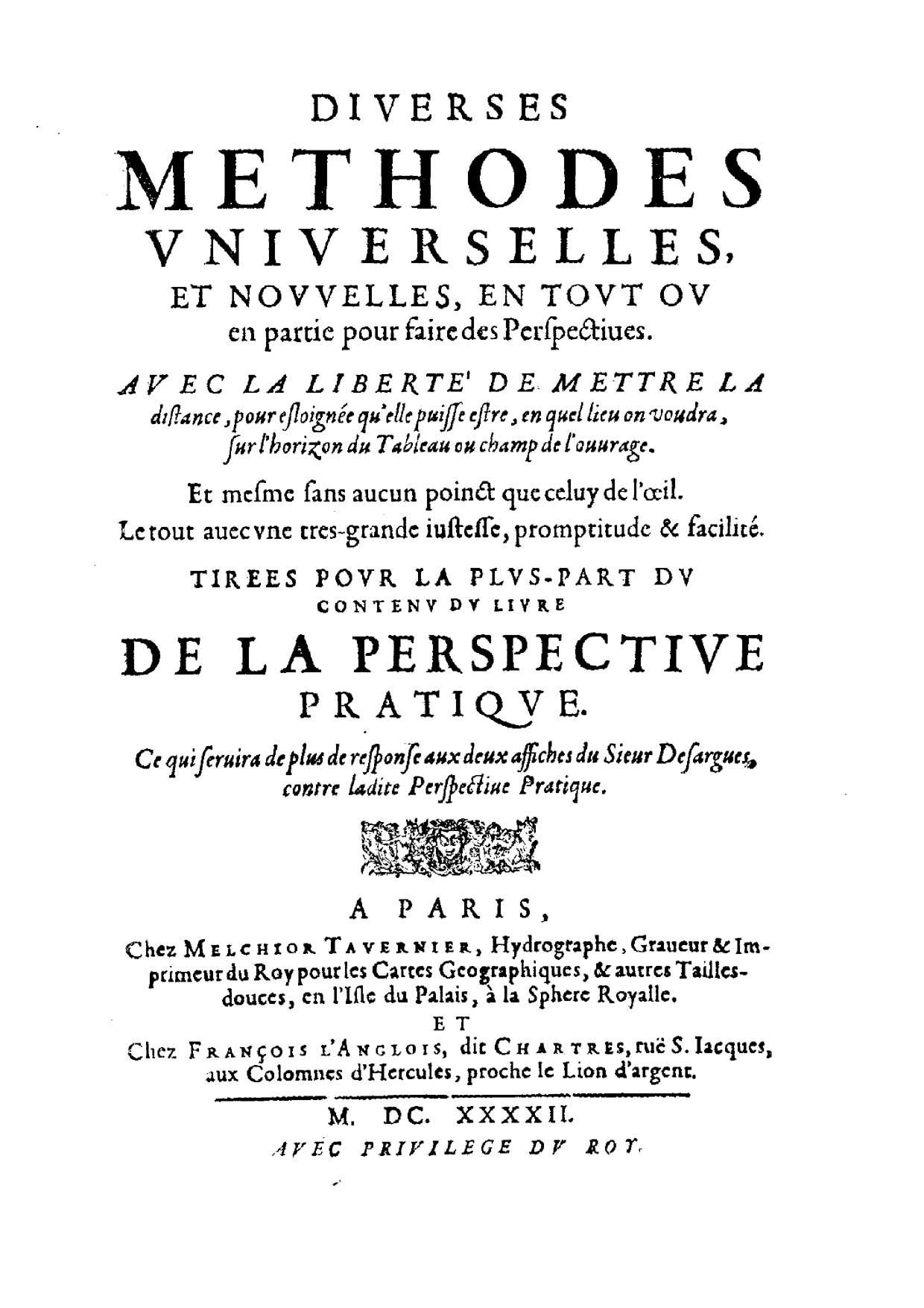
Jean Du Breuil, Diverses methodes universelles et nouvelles, en tout ou en partie pour faire des perspectives, 1642
