= Intersection theorem =

In projective geometry, an intersection theorem or incidence theorem is a statement concerning an incidence structure – consisting of points, lines, and possibly higher-dimensional objects and their incidences – together with a pair of objects A and B (for instance, a point and a line). The "theorem" states that, whenever a set of objects satisfies the incidences (i.e. can be identified with the objects of the incidence structure in such a way that incidence is preserved), then the objects A and B must also be incident. An intersection theorem is not necessarily true in all projective geometries; it is a property that some geometries satisfy but others don't.

For example, Desargues' theorem can be stated using the following incidence structure:

- Points: $\{A,B,C,a,b,c,P,Q,R,O\}$
- Lines: $\{AB,AC,BC,ab,ac,bc,Aa,Bb,Cc,PQ\}$
- Incidences (in addition to obvious ones such as $(A,AB)$): $\{(O,Aa),(O,Bb),(O,Cc),(P,BC),(P,bc),(Q,AC),(Q,ac),(R,AB),(R,ab)\}$

The implication is then $(R,PQ)$—that point R is incident with line P̅Q̅.

== Famous examples ==
Desargues' theorem holds in a projective plane P if and only if P is the projective plane over some division ring (skewfield) D — $P=\mathbb{P}_{2}D$. The projective plane is then called desarguesian. A theorem of Amitsur and Bergman states that, in the context of desarguesian projective planes, for every intersection theorem there is a rational identity such that the plane P satisfies the intersection theorem if and only if the division ring D satisfies the rational identity.

- Pappus's hexagon theorem holds in a desarguesian projective plane $\mathbb{P}_{2}D$ if and only if D is a field; it corresponds to the identity $\forall a,b\in D, \quad a\cdot b=b\cdot a$.
- Fano's axiom (which states a certain intersection does not happen) holds in $\mathbb{P}_{2}D$ if and only if D has characteristic $\neq 2$; it corresponds to the identity a + a = 0.
