= Complete icosahedron =

Complete icosahedron may refer to:

- an icosahedron which has had none of its faces removed, as opposed to a partial icosahedron such as a geodesic hemisphere
- Final stellation of the icosahedron, also called the "complete stellation of the icosahedron"
- In projective geometry, the complete icosahedron is a configuration of 20 planes and all their 3-fold (or higher) points of intersection (and optionally, depending on your understanding of a configuration, the various lines in space along which two planes meet)
