= Orchard-planting problem =

Geometry; how many 3-point lines can n points form

An arrangement of nine points (related to the Pappus configuration) forming ten 3-point lines.

In discrete geometry, the original orchard-planting problem (or the tree-planting problem) asks for the maximum number of 3-point lines attainable by a configuration of a specific number of points in the plane. There are also investigations into how many k-point lines there can be. Hallard T. Croft and Paul Erdős proved
$$t_k > \frac{cn^2}{k^3},$$
where n is the number of points and t_{k} is the number of k-point lines. Their construction contains some m-point lines, where m > k. One can also ask the question if these are not allowed.

== Integer sequence ==
Maximum possible number of 3-point lines 𝑡_{3} for 𝑛 from 3 to 11.

Define $t_3^\text{orchard}(n)$ to be the maximum number of 3-point lines attainable with a configuration of n points. For an arbitrary number of n points, $t_3^\text{orchard}(n)$ was shown to be $\tfrac{1}{6}n^2 - O(n)$ in 1974.

The first few values of $t_3^\text{orchard}(n)$ are given in the following table (sequence A003035 in the OEIS).

n	4	5	6	7	8	9	10	11	12	13	14
$t_3^\text{orchard}(n)$	1	2	4	6	7	10	12	16	19	22	26

== Upper and lower bounds ==
Since no two lines may share two distinct points, a trivial upper-bound for the number of 3-point lines determined by n points is
$$\left\lfloor \binom{n}{2} \Big/ \binom{3}{2} \right\rfloor = \left\lfloor \frac{n^2-n}{6} \right\rfloor.$$
Using the fact that the number of 2-point lines is at least $\tfrac{6n}{13}$ (Csima & Sawyer 1993), this upper bound can be lowered to
$$\left\lfloor \frac{\binom{n}{2} - \frac{6n}{13}}{3} \right\rfloor = \left\lfloor \frac{n^2}{6} - \frac{25n}{78} \right\rfloor.$$

Lower bounds for $t_3^\text{orchard}(n)$ are given by constructions for sets of points with many 3-point lines. The earliest quadratic lower bound of $\approx \tfrac{1}{8}n^2$ was given by Sylvester, who placed n points on the cubic curve y = x^{3}. This was improved to $\tfrac{1}{6}n^2 - \tfrac{1}{2}n + 1$ in 1974 by Burr, Grünbaum, and Sloane (1974), using a construction based on Weierstrass's elliptic functions. An elementary construction using hypocycloids was found by Füredi & Palásti (1984) achieving the same lower bound.

In September 2013, Ben Green and Terence Tao published a paper in which they prove that for all point sets of sufficient size, n > n_{0}, there are at most
$$\frac{n(n-3)}{6} + 1 =  \frac{1}{6}n^2 - \frac{1}{2}n + 1$$
3-point lines which matches the lower bound established by Burr, Grünbaum and Sloane. Thus, for sufficiently large n, the exact value of $t_3^\text{orchard}(n)$ is known.

This is slightly better than the bound that would directly follow from their tight lower bound of $\tfrac n 2$ for the number of 2-point lines: $\tfrac{n(n-2)}{6},$ proved in the same paper and solving a 1951 problem posed independently by Gabriel Andrew Dirac and Theodore Motzkin.

Orchard-planting problem has also been considered over finite fields. In this version of the problem, the n points lie in a projective plane defined over a finite field. (Padmanabhan & Shukla 2020).

== See also ==
- Arrangement of lines
