= Desmic system =

Configuration of 3 tetrahedra in projective geometry

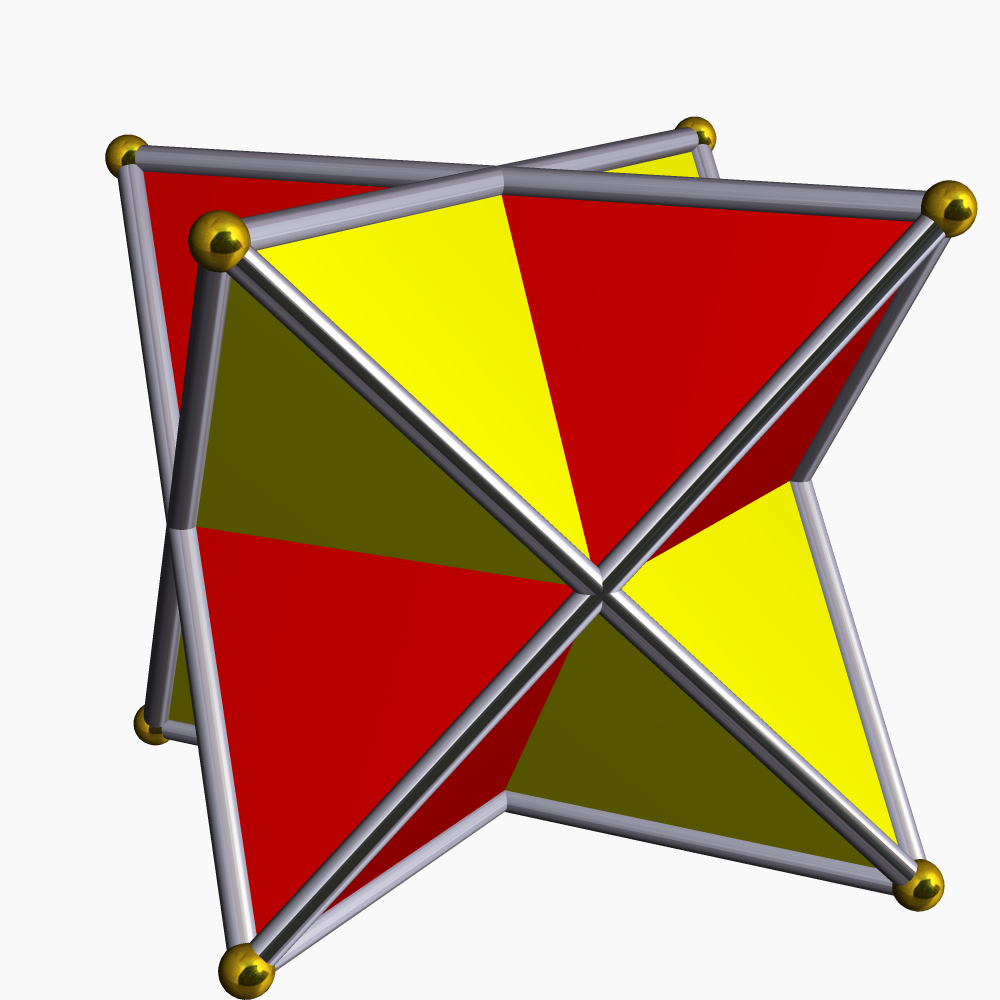
Two desmic tetrahedra. The third tetrahedron of this system is not shown, but has one vertex at the center and the other three on the plane at infinity.

The Reye configuration with the same 12 vertices as a desmic system

In projective geometry, a desmic system (from Greek δεσμός 'band, chain') is a set of three tetrahedra in 3-dimensional projective space, such that any two are desmic (related such that each edge of one cuts a pair of opposite edges of the other). It was introduced by Stephanos (1879). The three tetrahedra of a desmic system are contained in a pencil of quartic surfaces.

Every line that passes through two vertices of two tetrahedra in the system also passes through a vertex of the third tetrahedron. The 12 vertices of the desmic system and the 16 lines formed in this way are the points and lines of a Reye configuration.

== Example ==
The three tetrahedra given by the equations

- $\displaystyle (w^2-x^2)(y^2-z^2) = 0$
- $\displaystyle (w^2-y^2)(x^2-z^2) = 0$
- $\displaystyle (w^2-z^2)(y^2-x^2) = 0$

form a desmic system, contained in the pencil of quartics

- $\displaystyle a(w^2x^2+y^2z^2) + b(w^2y^2+x^2z^2) + c (w^2z^2+x^2y^2) = 0$

for a + b + c = 0.
