= Wirtinger sextic =

In mathematics, the Wirtinger plane sextic curve, studied by Wirtinger in 1892, is a degree 6 genus 4 plane curve with double points at the 6 vertices of a complete quadrilateral.
