= Girard Desargues =

French mathematician and engineer (1591–1661)

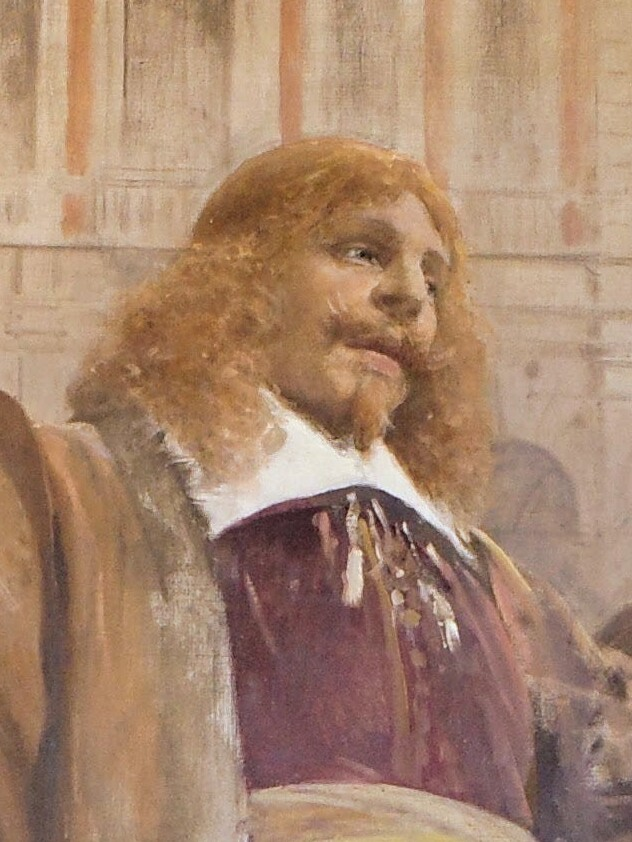
- Imaginative portrait by Théobald Chartran, c. 1855
- Born: 21 February 1591; Lyon, France
- Died: September 1661 (aged 70); Lyon, France
- Known for: Desarguesian plane, non-Desarguesian plane, Desargues's theorem, Desargues graph, Desargues configuration, Desargues (crater)
- Scientific career
- Fields: Mathematics

Girard Desargues (French: [ʒiʁaʁ dezaʁɡ]; 21 February 1591 – September 1661) was a French mathematician and engineer, who is considered one of the founders of projective geometry. Desargues's theorem, the Desargues graph, and the crater Desargues on the Moon are named in his honour.

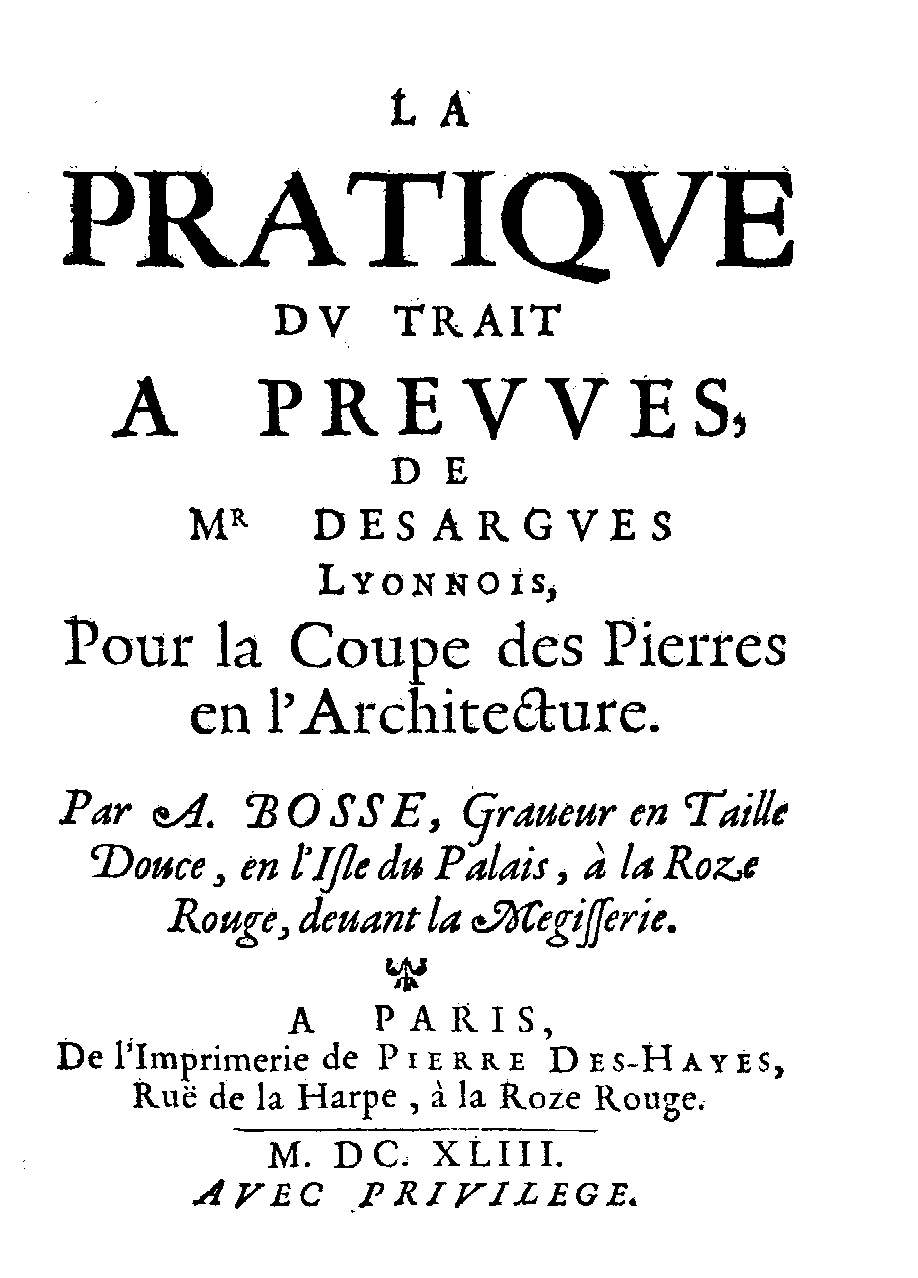
Pratique du trait a preuves (1643)

== Biography ==
Born in Lyon, Desargues came from a family devoted to service to the French crown. His father was a royal notary, an investigating commissioner of the Seneschal's court in Lyon (1574), the collector of the tithes on ecclesiastical revenues for the city of Lyon (1583) and for the diocese of Lyon.

Girard Desargues worked as an architect from 1645. Prior to that, he had worked as a tutor and may have served as an engineer and technical consultant in the entourage of Richelieu. Yet his involvement in the Siege of La Rochelle, though alleged by Ch. Weiss in Biographie Universelle (1842), has never been testified.

As an architect, Desargues planned several private and public buildings in Paris and Lyon. As an engineer, he designed a system for raising water that he installed near Paris. It was based on the use of the epicycloidal wheel, the principle of which was unrecognized at the time.

His research on perspective and geometrical projections can be seen as a culmination of centuries of scientific inquiry across the classical epoch in optics that stretched from al-Hasan Ibn al-Haytham (Alhazen) to Johannes Kepler, and going beyond a mere synthesis of these traditions with Renaissance perspective theories and practices.

His work was rediscovered and republished in 1864. A collection of his works was published in 1951, and the 1864 compilation remains in print. One notable work, often cited by others in mathematics, is "Rough draft for an essay on the results of taking plane sections of a cone" (1639).

Late in his life, Desargues published a paper with the cryptic title of DALG. The most common theory about what this stands for is Des Argues, Lyonnais, Géometre (proposed by Henri Brocard).

He died in Lyon. The Desargues crater on the Moon is named after him.

== See also ==
- Desarguesian plane, non-Desarguesian plane
- Desargues's theorem
- Desargues graph
- Desargues configuration
- Perspective (graphical) / Perspective (visual)
- Optics

== Sources ==
- J. V. Field & J. J. Gray (1987) The Geometrical Work of Girard Desargues, Springer-Verlag, ISBN 0-387-96403-7.
- René Taton (1962) Sur la naissance de Girard Desargues., Revue d'histoire des sciences et de leurs applications Tome 15 n°2. pp. 165–166.
