= Complete quadrangle =

Geometric figure made of 4 points connected by 6 lines

A complete quadrangle (at left) and a complete quadrilateral (at right).

In mathematics, specifically in incidence geometry and especially in projective geometry, a complete quadrangle is a system of geometric objects consisting of any four points in a plane, no three of which are on a common line, and of the six lines connecting the six pairs of points. Dually, a complete quadrilateral is a system of four lines, no three of which pass through the same point, and the six points of intersection of these lines. The complete quadrangle was called a tetrastigm by Lachlan (1893), and the complete quadrilateral was called a tetragram; those terms are occasionally still used. The complete quadrilateral has also been called a Pasch configuration, especially in the context of Steiner triple systems.

== Diagonals ==
The six lines of a complete quadrangle meet in pairs to form three additional points called the diagonal points of the quadrangle. Similarly, among the six points of a complete quadrilateral there are three pairs of points that are not already connected by lines; the line segments connecting these pairs are called diagonals. For points and lines in the Euclidean plane, the diagonal points cannot lie on a single line, and the diagonals cannot have a single point of triple crossing. Due to the discovery of the Fano plane, a finite geometry in which the diagonal points of a complete quadrangle are collinear, some authors have augmented the axioms of projective geometry with Fano's axiom that the diagonal points are not collinear, while others have been less restrictive.

A set of contracted expressions for the parts of a complete quadrangle were introduced by G. B. Halsted: He calls the vertices of the quadrangle dots, and the diagonal points he calls codots. The lines of the projective space are called straights, and in the quadrangle they are called connectors. The "diagonal lines" of Coxeter are called opposite connectors by Halsted. Opposite connectors cross at a codot. The configuration of the complete quadrangle is a tetrastim.

== Projective properties ==
KLMN is a complete quadrangle; D is the projective harmonic conjugate of C with respect to A and B.

As systems of points and lines in which all points belong to the same number of lines and all lines contain the same number of points, the complete quadrangle and the complete quadrilateral both form projective configurations; in the notation of projective configurations, the complete quadrangle is written as (4_{3}6_{2}) and the complete quadrilateral is written (6_{2}4_{3}), where the numbers in this notation refer to the numbers of points, lines per point, lines, and points per line of the configuration. The projective dual of a complete quadrangle is a complete quadrilateral, and vice versa. For any two complete quadrangles, or any two complete quadrilaterals, there is a unique projective transformation taking one of the two configurations into the other.

Karl von Staudt reformed mathematical foundations in 1847 with the complete quadrangle when he noted that a "harmonic property" could be based on concomitants of the quadrangle: When each pair of opposite sides of the quadrangle intersect on a line, then the diagonals intersect the line at projective harmonic conjugate positions. The four points on the line deriving from the sides and diagonals of the quadrangle are called a harmonic range. Through perspectivity and projectivity, the harmonic property is stable. Developments of modern geometry and algebra note the influence of von Staudt on Mario Pieri and Felix Klein .

== Euclidean properties ==
In the Euclidean plane, the four lines of a complete quadrilateral must not include any pairs of parallel lines, so that every pair of lines has a crossing point.

Wells (1991) describes several additional properties of complete quadrilaterals that involve metric properties of the Euclidean plane, rather than being purely projective. The midpoints of the diagonals are collinear, and (as proved by Isaac Newton) also collinear with the center of a conic that is tangent to all four lines of the quadrilateral. Any three of the lines of the quadrilateral form the sides of a triangle; the orthocenters of the four triangles formed in this way lie on a second line (known as the ortholine, Steiner line or Aubert line), perpendicular to the one through the midpoints. The circumcircles of these same four triangles meet in a point. In addition, the three circles having the diagonals as diameters belong to a common pencil of circles the axis of which is the line through the orthocenters.

The polar circles of the triangles of a complete quadrilateral form a coaxal system.

== See also ==
- Newton line
- Nine-point conic
- Quadrilateral
- Wirtinger sextic
