= Möbius configuration =

Geometric system of two mutually inscribed tetrahedra

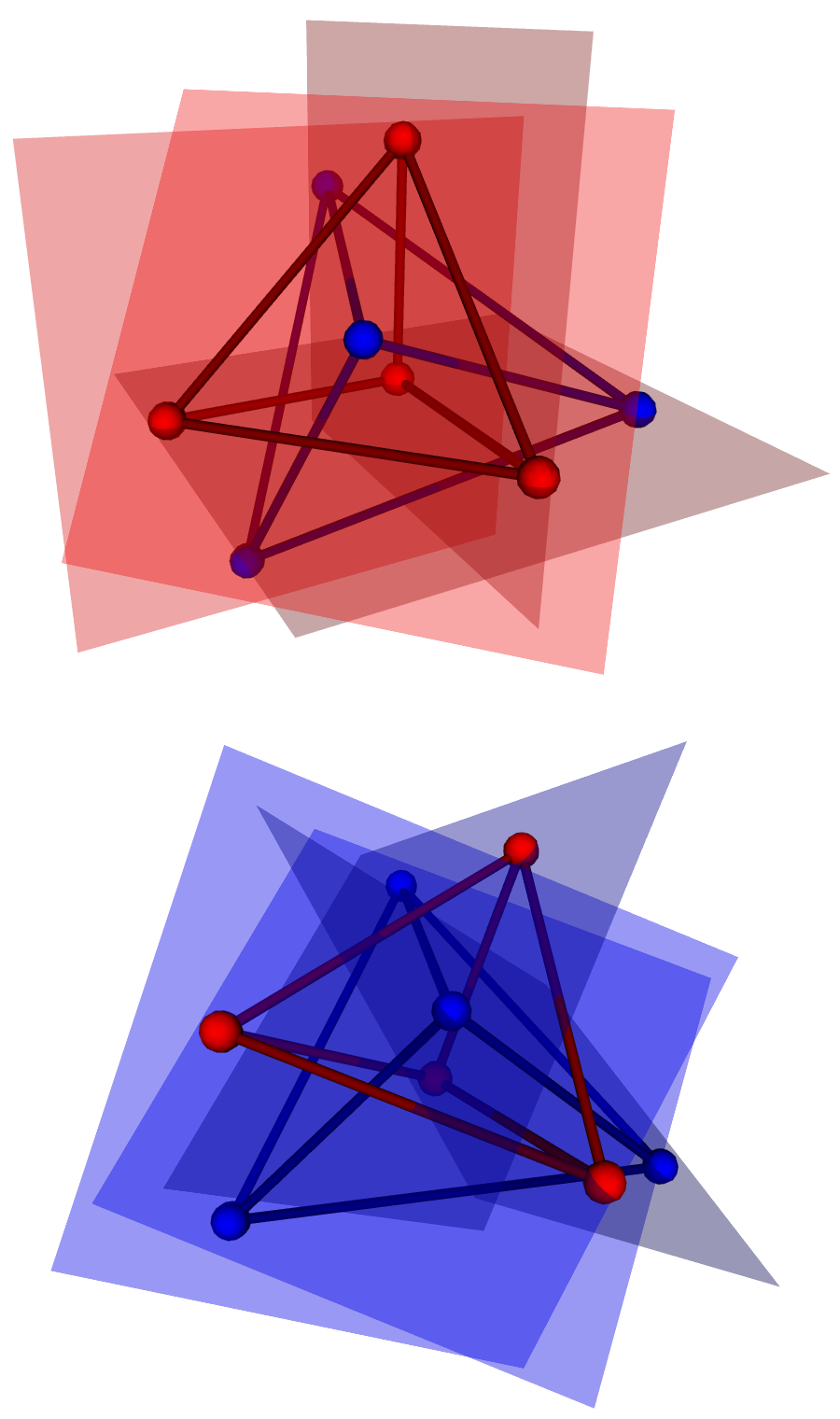
Example of Möbius configuration with face planes of each colored tetrahedra shown. Vertex coordinates: $(0, 0, 0),$ $(0, 0, 1),$ $(0, 1, 0),$ $(1, 0, 0).$ Vertex coordinates: $\left(0, -\tfrac{1}{\sqrt 2}, \tfrac{1}{\sqrt 2}\right),$ $\left(\tfrac{1}{\sqrt 2}, 0, -\tfrac{1}{\sqrt 2}\right),$ $\left(-\tfrac{1}{\sqrt 2}, \tfrac{1}{\sqrt 2}, 0\right),$ $\left(\tfrac{1}{3}, \tfrac{1}{3}, \tfrac{1}{3}\right).$

In geometry, the Möbius configuration or Möbius tetrads is a certain configuration in Euclidean space or projective space, consisting of two tetrahedra that are mutually inscribed: each vertex of one tetrahedron lies on a face plane of the other tetrahedron and vice versa. Thus, for the resulting system of eight points and eight planes, each point lies on four planes (the three planes defining it as a vertex of a tetrahedron and the fourth plane from the other tetrahedron that it lies on), and each plane contains four points (the three tetrahedron vertices of its face, and the vertex from the other tetrahedron that lies on it).

== Möbius's theorem ==
The configuration is named after August Ferdinand Möbius, who in 1828 proved that, if two tetrahedra have the property that seven of their vertices lie on corresponding face planes of the other tetrahedron, then the eighth vertex also lies on the plane of its corresponding face, forming a configuration of this type. This incidence theorem is true more generally in a three-dimensional projective space if and only if Pappus's theorem holds for that space (Reidemeister, Schönhardt), and it is true for a three-dimensional space modeled on a division ring if and only if the ring satisfies the commutative law and is therefore a field (Al-Dhahir). By projective duality, Möbius' result is equivalent to the statement that, if seven of the eight face planes of two tetrahedra contain the corresponding vertices of the other tetrahedron, then the eighth face plane also contains the same vertex.

== Construction ==
Coxeter (1950) describes a simple construction for the configuration. Beginning with an arbitrary point p in Euclidean space, let A, B, C, D be four planes through p, no three of which share a common intersection line, and place the six points q, r, s, t, u, v on the six lines formed by pairwise intersection of these planes in such a way that no four of these points are coplanar. For each of the planes A, B, C, D, four of the seven points p, q, r, s, t, u, v lie on that plane and three are disjointed from it; form planes A', B', C', D' through the triples of points disjoint from A, B, C, D respectively. Then, by the dual form of Möbius' theorem, these four new planes meet in a single point w. The eight points p, q, r, s, t, u, v, w and the eight planes A, B, C, D, A', B', C', D' form an instance of Möbius' configuration.

== Related constructions ==
Hilbert & Cohn-Vossen (1952) state (without references) that there are five configurations having eight points and eight planes with four points on every plane and four planes through every point that are realisable in three-dimensional Euclidean space: such configurations have the shorthand notation 8_{4}. They must have obtained their information from the article by Ernst Steinitz (1910). This actually states, depending upon results by P. Muth (1892), G. Bauer (1897), and V. Martinetti (1897), that there are five 8_{4} configurations with the property that at most two planes have two points in common, and dually at most two points are common to two planes. (This condition means that every three points may be non-collinear and dually three planes may not have a line in common.) However, there are ten other 8_{4} configurations that do not have this condition, and all fifteen configurations are realizable in real three-dimensional space. The configurations of interest are those with two tetrahedra, each inscribing and circumscribing the other, and these are precisely those that satisfy the above property. Thus, there are five configurations with tetrahedra, and they correspond to the five conjugacy classes of the symmetric group S_{4}. One obtains a permutation from the four points of one tetrahedron S = ABCD to itself as follows: each point P of S is on a plane containing three points of the second tetrahedron T. This leaves the other point of T, which is on three points of a plane of S, leaving another point Q of S, and so the permutation maps P → Q. The five conjugacy classes have representatives e, (12)(34), (12), (123), (1234) and, of these, the Möbius configuration corresponds to the conjugacy class e. It could be denoted Ke. It is stated by Steinitz that if two of the complementary tetrahedra of Ke are A_{0}, B_{0}, C_{0}, D_{0}, and A_{1}, B_{1}, C_{1}, D_{1} then the eight planes are given by A_{i}, B_{j}, C_{k}, D_{l} with i + j + k + l odd, while the even sums and their complements correspond to all pairs of complementary tetrahedra that in- and circumscribe in the model of Ke.

It is also stated that by Steinitz that the only S_{4} that is a geometrical theorem is the Möbius configuration. However that is disputed: Glynn (2010) shows using a computer search and proofs that there are precisely two S_{4} that are actually "theorems": the Möbius configuration and one other. The latter (which corresponds to the conjugacy class (12)(34) above) is also a theorem for all three-dimensional projective spaces over a field, but not over a general division ring. There are other close similarities between the two configurations, including the fact that both are self-dual under Matroid duality. In abstract terms, the latter configuration has "points" 0, ..., 7 and "planes" 0125 + i, (i = 0, ..., 7), where these integers are modulo eight. This configuration, like Möbius, can also be represented as two tetrahedra, mutually inscribed and circumscribed: in the integer representation the tetrahedra can be 0347 and 1256. However, these two S_{4} configurations are non-isomorphic, since Möbius has four pairs of disjoint planes, while the latter one has no disjoint planes. For a similar reason (and because pairs of planes are degenerate quadratic surfaces), the Möbius configuration is on more quadratic surfaces of three-dimensional space than the latter configuration.

The Levi graph of the Möbius configuration has 16 vertices, one for each point or plane of the configuration, with an edge for every incident point-plane pair. It is isomorphic to the 16-vertex hypercube graph Q_{4}. A closely related configuration, the Möbius–Kantor configuration formed by two mutually inscribed quadrilaterals, has the Möbius–Kantor graph, a subgraph of Q_{4}, as its Levi graph.
