= Möbius–Kantor configuration =

Geometric structure of 8 points and 8 lines

The Möbius–Kantor configuration

In geometry, the Möbius–Kantor configuration is a configuration consisting of eight points and eight lines, with three points on each line and three lines through each point. It is not possible to draw points and lines having this pattern of incidences in the Euclidean plane, but it is possible in the complex projective plane.

== Coordinates ==
August Ferdinand Möbius asked in 1828 whether there exists a pair of polygons with $p$ sides each, having the property that the vertices of one polygon lie on the lines through the edges of the other polygon, and vice versa. If so, the vertices and edges of these polygons would form a projective configuration. For $p = 4$ there is no solution in the Euclidean plane, but in 1882 Seligmann Kantor found pairs of polygons of this type, for a generalization of the problem in which the points and edges belong to the complex projective plane. That is, in Kantor's solution, the coordinates of the polygon vertices are complex numbers. Kantor's solution for $p = 4$, a pair of mutually-inscribed quadrilaterals in the complex projective plane, is called the Möbius–Kantor configuration.

Seven of the lines of the configuration can be made straight, but not all eight

H. S. M. Coxeter has provided the following simple complex projective coordinates for the eight points of the Möbius–Kantor configuration:
$$\begin{align}
&(1,0,0),& (0,0,1),\\
&(\omega, -1, 1),& (-1, 0, 1),\\
&(-1,\omega^2,1),& (1,\omega,0),\\
& (0,1,0),& (0,-1,1),\\
\end{align}$$
where $\omega$ denotes a complex cube root of 1.

The eight points and eight lines of the Möbius–Kantor configuration, with these coordinates, form the eight vertices and eight 3-edges of the complex polygon denoted $3\{3\}3$. Coxeter named it a Möbius–Kantor polygon.

== Abstract incidence pattern ==
The Möbius–Kantor graph, the Levi graph of the Möbius–Kantor configuration. Vertices of one color represent the points of the configuration, and vertices of the other color represent the lines.

More abstractly, the Möbius–Kantor configuration can be described as a system of eight points and eight triples of points such that each point belongs to exactly three of the triples. With the additional conditions (natural to points and lines) that no pair of points belong to more than one triple and that no two triples have more than one point in their intersection, any two systems of this type are equivalent under some permutation of the points. That is, the Möbius–Kantor configuration is the unique projective configuration of type (8_{3}8_{3}).

The Möbius–Kantor graph derives its name from being the Levi graph of the Möbius–Kantor configuration. It has one vertex per point and one vertex per triple, with an edge connecting two vertices if they correspond to a point and to a triple that contains that point.

The points and lines of the Möbius–Kantor configuration can be described as a matroid, whose elements are the points of the configuration and whose nontrivial flats are the lines of the configuration. In this matroid, a set S of points is independent if and only if either $|S|\le 2$ or S consists of three non-collinear points. As a matroid, it has been called the MacLane matroid, after the work of Saunders MacLane (1936) proving that it cannot be oriented; it is one of several known minor-minimal non-orientable matroids.

== Related configurations ==
The solution to Möbius' problem of mutually inscribed polygons for values of p greater than four is also of interest. In particular, one possible solution for $p = 5$ is the Desargues configuration, a set of ten points and ten lines, three points per line and three lines per point, that does admit a Euclidean realization. The Möbius configuration is a three-dimensional analogue of the Möbius–Kantor configuration consisting of two mutually inscribed tetrahedra.

The Möbius–Kantor configuration can be augmented by adding four lines through the four pairs of points not already connected by lines, and by adding a ninth point on the four new lines. The resulting configuration, the Hesse configuration, shares with the Möbius–Kantor configuration the property of being realizable with complex coordinates but not with real coordinates. Deleting any one point from the Hesse configuration produces a copy of the Möbius–Kantor configuration. Both configurations may also be described algebraically in terms of the abelian group $\Z_3\times \Z_3$ with nine elements. This group has four subgroups of order three (the subsets of elements of the form $(i,0)$, $(i,i)$, $(i,2i)$, and $(0,i)$ respectively), each of which can be used to partition the nine group elements into three cosets of three elements per coset. These nine elements and twelve cosets form the Hesse configuration. Removing the zero element and the four cosets containing zero gives rise to the Möbius–Kantor configuration.
