= Császár polyhedron =

Toroidal polyhedron with 14 triangle faces

- A Császár polyhedron
- Type: Toroidal polyhedron
- Faces: 14 triangles
- Edges: 21
- Vertices: 7
- Euler char.: 0 (Genus 1)
- Vertex configuration: 3.3.3.3.3.3
- Symmetry group: C_{1}, [ ]^{+}, (11)
- Dual polyhedron: Szilassi polyhedron
- Properties: Non-convex

3D model of the Császár polyhedron

In geometry, the Császár polyhedron (Hungarian: [ˈt͡ʃaːsaːr]) is a nonconvex toroidal polyhedron with 14 triangular faces.

This polyhedron has no diagonals; every pair of vertices is connected by an edge. The seven vertices and 21 edges of the Császár polyhedron form an embedding of the complete graph K_{7} onto a topological torus. Of the 35 possible triangles from vertices of the polyhedron, only 14 are faces.

== Complete graph ==
The tetrahedron and the Császár polyhedron are the only two known polyhedra (having a manifold boundary) without any diagonals: every two vertices of the polygon are connected by an edge, so there is no line segment between two vertices that does not lie on the polyhedron boundary. That is, the vertices and edges of the Császár polyhedron form a complete graph.

The combinatorial description of this polyhedron has been described earlier by Möbius. Three additional different polyhedra of this type can be found in a paper by Bokowski and Eggert in 1991.

If the boundary of a polyhedron with v vertices forms a surface with h holes, in such a way that every pair of vertices is connected by an edge, it follows by some manipulation of the Euler characteristic that
$$h = \frac{(v-3)(v-4)}{12}.$$
This equation is satisfied for the tetrahedron with h = 0 and v = 4, and for the Császár polyhedron with h = 1 and v = 7. The next possible solution, h = 6 and v = 12, would correspond to a polyhedron with 44 faces and 66 edges, but it is not realizable as a polyhedron. It is not known whether such a polyhedron exists with a higher genus.

More generally, this equation can be satisfied only when v is congruent to 0, 3, 4, or 7 modulo 12.

== History and related polyhedra ==
The Császár polyhedron is named after Hungarian topologist Ákos Császár, who discovered it in 1949. The dual to the Császár polyhedron, the Szilassi polyhedron, was discovered later, in 1977, by Lajos Szilassi; it has 14 vertices, 21 edges, and seven hexagonal faces, each sharing an edge with every other face. Like the Császár polyhedron, the Szilassi polyhedron has the topology of a torus.

There are other known polyhedra such as the Schönhardt polyhedron for which there are no interior diagonals (that is, all diagonals are outside the polyhedron) as well as non-manifold surfaces with no diagonals.
