= Bonnie Stewart =

American mathematician

Bonnie Madison Stewart (July 10, 1914 – April 15, 1994) was a professor of mathematics at Michigan State University from 1940 to 1980. He earned his Ph.D. from the University of Wisconsin–Madison in 1941, under the supervision of Cyrus Colton MacDuffee.

== Contributions ==
=== Number theory ===
In 1952, the first edition of his book, Theory of Numbers, was published. Stewart's contributions to number theory also include a complete characterization of the practical numbers in terms of their factorizations, which he published in 1954, a year before Wacław Sierpiński's independent discovery of the same result.

=== Geometry ===
In 1970 he published a book, Adventures Among the Toroids. A study of orientable polyhedra with regular faces, in which he discussed what are now called Stewart toroids. The book was handwritten in calligraphy with many formulas and illustrations. Like the Platonic solids, Archimedean solids, and Johnson solids, the Stewart polyhedra have regular polygons as faces. The first three categories are all convex, whereas Stewart toroids have polygonal-faced tunnels.

== Selected publications ==
- B. M. Stewart, Theory of Numbers, Macmillan, 1952. 2nd ed., Macmillan, 1964.
- B. M. Stewart (1954), "Sums of distinct divisors", American Journal of Mathematics, 76 (4): 779–785, doi:10.2307/2372651, JSTOR 2372651, MR 0064800.
- B. M. Stewart, Adventures Among the Toroids (1970) This 5"x13" edition was self-published by the author (printed by The John Henry Company) and has no ISBN.
- B. M. Stewart, Adventures Among the Toroids, Revised Second Edition (1980) 11"x8.5". ISBN 0-686-11936-3, converted much later to ISBN 978-0-686-11936-4
