= Seligmann Kantor =

Bohemian mathematician (1857–1903)

Seligmann Kantor (6 December 1857, Sobědruhy – 21 March 1903, Sobědruhy) was a Bohemian-born, German-speaking mathematician of Jewish origin in the Austro-Hungarian Empire. He is known for the Möbius–Kantor configuration and the Möbius-Kantor graph.

== Biography ==
Kantor studied mathematics and physics at the Technische Hochschule in Vienna, then studied in 1878 in Rome with Luigi Cremona, in Strasbourg, and in 1880 in Paris. In 1881, he received his Habilitation at the K. K. Deutsche Technische Hochschule (DTH) in Prague. He was appointed there in 1883 a Privatdozent for mathematics and continued in that academic post until 1888. He was considered for a professorship in Vienna, but antisemitic political agitation prevented his appointment.

The atmosphere surrounding the appointment of Jewish professors remained oppressive throughout the post-1867 period, and the visibility of anti-Semitic views increased after 1890. ... In the 1880s the mathematician Seligmann Kantor was a victim of street assaults, leading the faculty to consider him an inappropriate candidate for a professorship. ... Shortly afterward, Kantor moved to Italy. The appointment of Jewish scholars to professorships led to student protests as well. In Vienna the press protested the appointment of Emil Zuckerkandl and Julius Tandler.

== Selected publications ==
- Kantor, Seligmann (July 1880). "Wie viele cyclische Gruppen gibt es in einer quadratischen Transformation der Ebene?". Annali di Matematica Pura ed Applicata. 10 (1): 64–70. doi:10.1007/BF02420161. ISSN 0373-3114. S2CID 119564670.
- Kantor, Seligmann (1897). "Theorie der Transformationen Im R_{3}, welche keine Fundamentalcurven 1. Art besitzen und ihrer endlichen gruppen". Acta Mathematica. 21: 1–78. doi:10.1007/BF02417975. S2CID 121708179.
