= Torus =

Doughnut-shaped surface of revolution

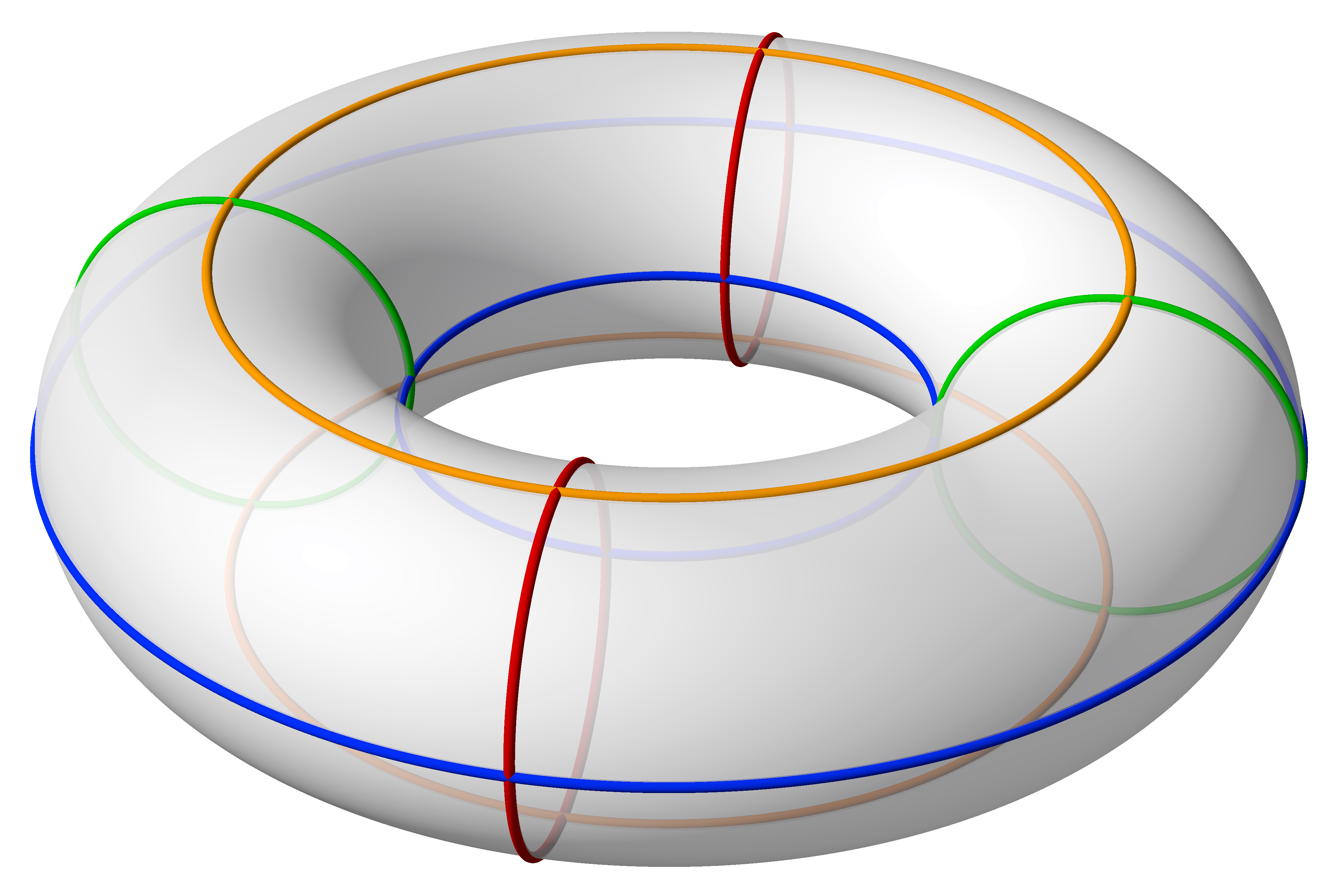
A ring torus with a selection of circles on its surface

As the distance from the axis of revolution decreases, the ring torus becomes a horn torus, then a spindle torus, and finally degenerates into a double-covered sphere.

A ring torus with aspect ratio 3, the ratio between the diameters of the larger (blue) circle and the smaller (red) circle. The two radii coordinates are shown as well. The radius denoted by capital, R, is the distance from the geometric center of the outer ring lying outside the volume, to the center of the inner ring. The radius denoted by lower case, r, is the distance from the inner ring's center to the surface of the torus.

In geometry, a torus (pl.: tori or toruses) is a surface of revolution generated by revolving a circle in three-dimensional space one full revolution about an axis that is coplanar with the circle. The main types of tori include ring tori, horn tori, and spindle tori. A ring torus is sometimes colloquially referred to as a doughnut.

If the axis of revolution does not touch the circle, the surface has a ring shape and is called a torus of revolution, also known as a ring torus. If the axis of revolution is tangent to the circle, the surface is a horn torus. If the axis of revolution passes twice through the circle, the surface is a spindle torus (or self-crossing torus or self-intersecting torus). If the axis of revolution passes through the center of the circle, the surface is a degenerate torus, a double-covered sphere. If the revolved curve is not a circle, the surface is called a toroid, as in a square toroid.

Real-world objects that approximate a torus of revolution include swim rings, inner tubes and ringette rings.

A torus is different from a solid torus, which is formed by rotating a disk, rather than a circle, around an axis. A solid torus is a torus plus the volume inside the torus. Real-world objects that approximate a solid torus include O-rings, non-inflatable lifebuoys, ring doughnuts, and bagels.

In topology, a ring torus is homeomorphic to the Cartesian product of two circles: S^{1} × S^{1}, which is sometimes used as the definition. It is a compact 2-manifold of genus 1. The ring torus is one way to embed this space into Euclidean space, but another way to do this is the Cartesian product of the embedding of S^{1} in the plane with itself. This produces a geometric object called the Clifford torus, a surface in 4-space.

In the field of topology, a torus is any topological space that is homeomorphic to a torus. The surface of a coffee cup and a doughnut are both topological tori with genus one.

An example of a torus can be constructed by taking a rectangular strip of flexible material such as rubber, and joining the top edge to the bottom edge, and the left edge to the right edge, without any half-twists (compare Klein bottle).

== Etymology ==
Torus is a Latin word denoting something round, a swelling, an elevation, a protuberance.

== Geometry ==
Bottom-halves and
vertical cross-sections

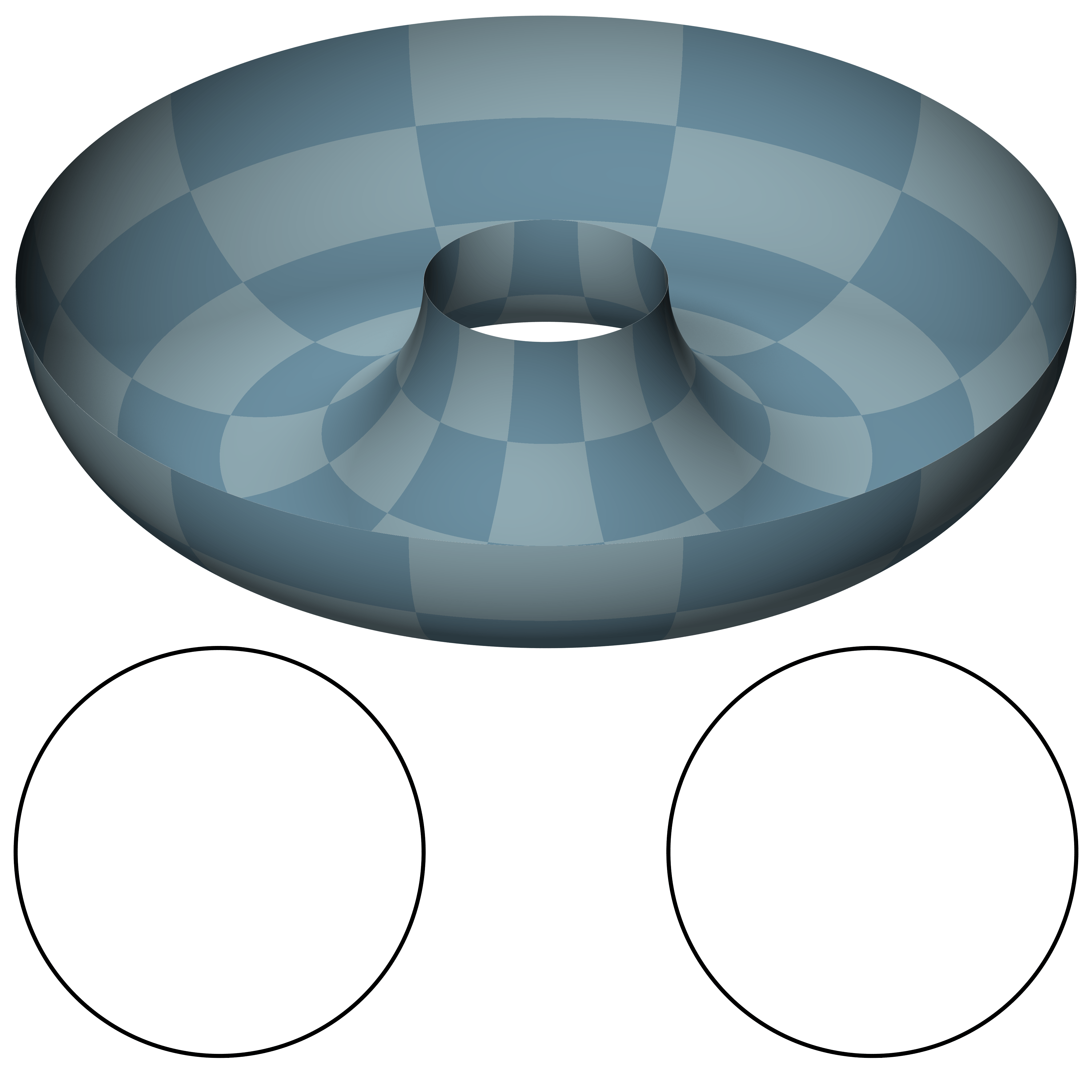
R > r: ring torus or anchor ring

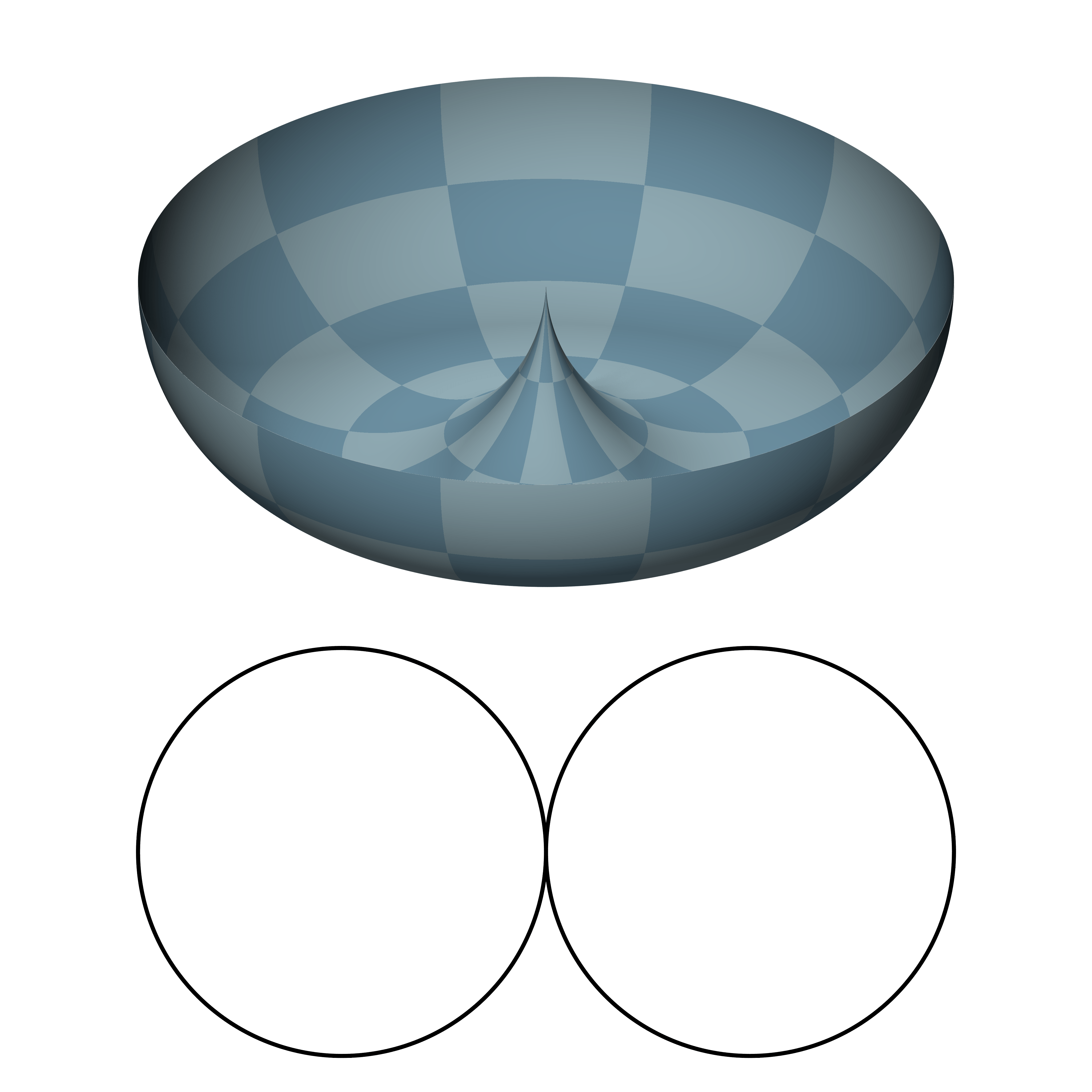
R=r: horn torus

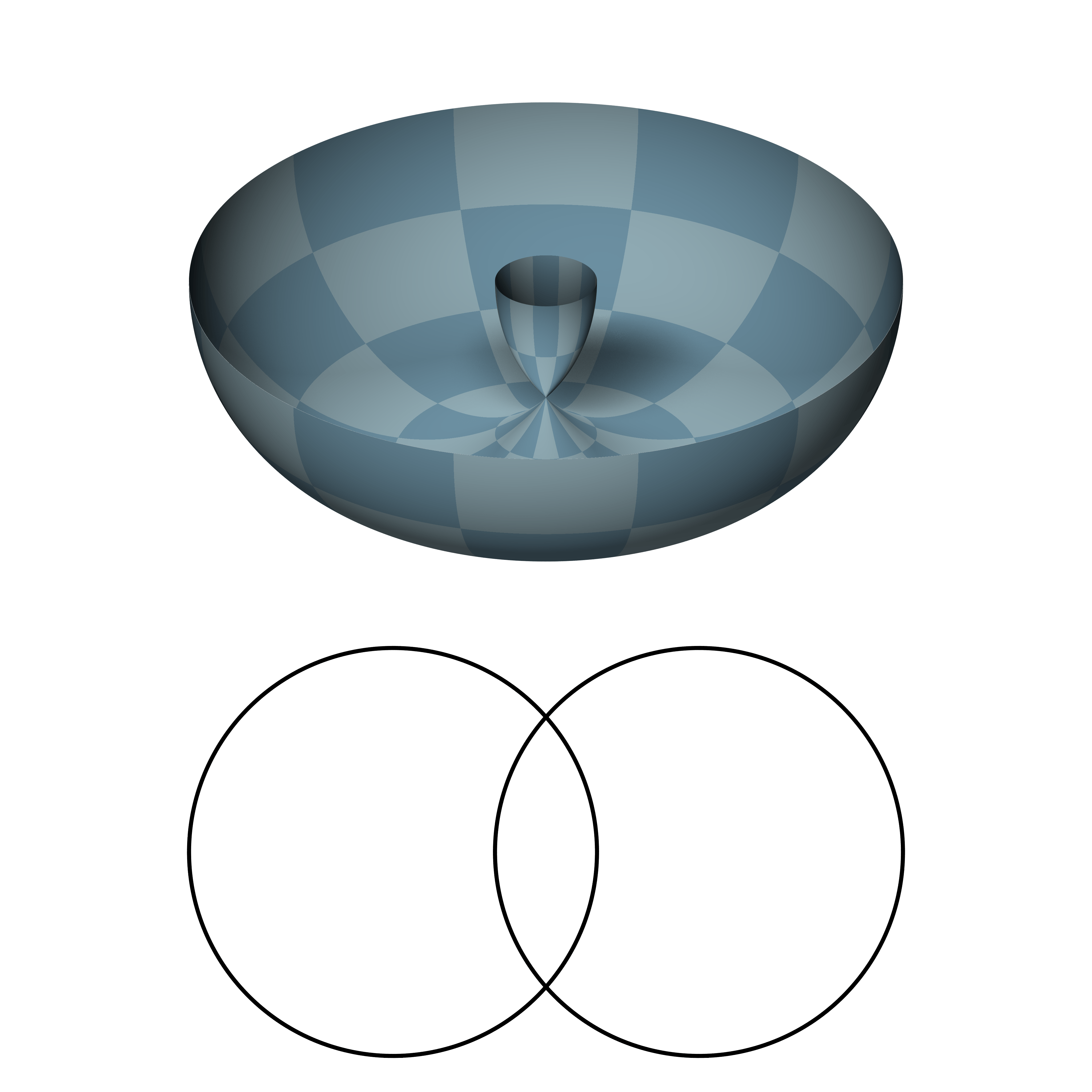
R < r: self-intersecting spindle torus

A torus of revolution in 3-space can be parametrized as:
$$\begin{align}
x(\theta, \varphi) &= (R + r \sin \theta) \cos{\varphi}\\
y(\theta, \varphi) &= (R + r \sin \theta) \sin{\varphi}\\
z(\theta, \varphi) &= r \cos \theta\\
\end{align}$$
using angular coordinates $\theta,\varphi \in [0, 2\pi)$, representing rotation around the tube and rotation around the torus's axis of revolution, respectively, where the major radius R is the distance from the center of the tube to the center of the torus and the minor radius r is the radius of the tube.

The ratio R/r is called the aspect ratio of the torus. The typical doughnut confectionery has an aspect ratio of about 3 to 2.

An implicit equation in Cartesian coordinates for a torus radially symmetric about the z-axis is
$${\textstyle \bigl(\sqrt{x^2 + y^2} - R\bigr)^2} + z^2 = r^2.$$

Algebraically eliminating the square root gives a quartic equation,
$$\left(x^2 + y^2 + z^2 + R^2 - r^2\right)^2 = 4R^2\left(x^2+y^2\right).$$

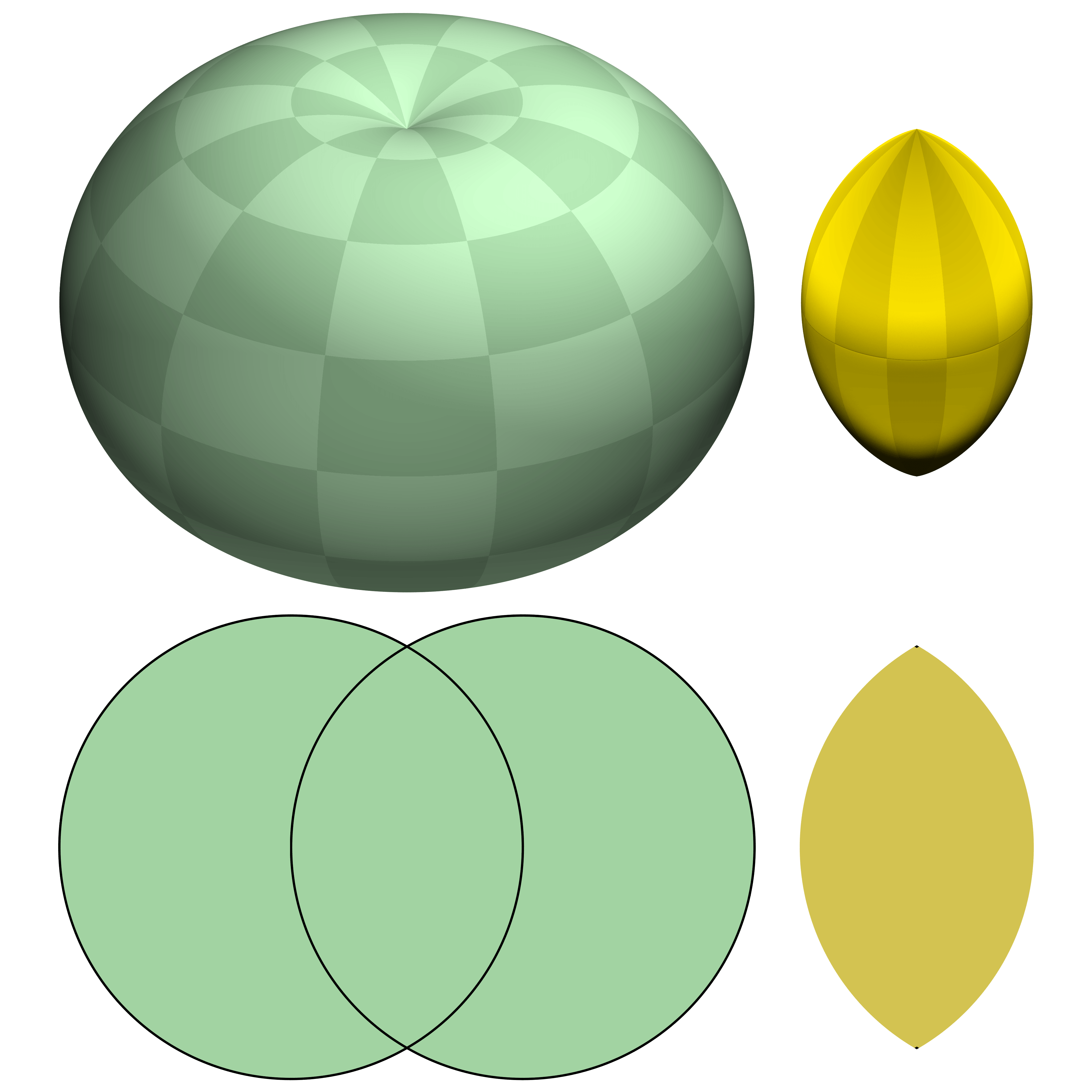
An apple and a lemon derived from a spindle torus with proportions of a vesica piscis

The three classes of standard tori correspond to the three possible aspect ratios between R and r:

- When R > r, the surface will be the familiar ring torus or anchor ring.
- R = r corresponds to the horn torus, which in effect is a torus with no "hole".
- R < r describes the self-intersecting spindle torus; its inner shell is a lemon and its outer shell is an apple.
- When R = 0, the torus degenerates to the sphere radius r.
- When r = 0, the torus degenerates to the circle radius R.

When R ≥ r, the interior
$${\textstyle \bigl(\sqrt{x^2 + y^2} - R\bigr)^2} + z^2 < r^2$$
of this torus is diffeomorphic (and, hence, homeomorphic) to a product of a Euclidean open disk and a circle. The volume of this solid torus and the surface area of its torus are easily computed using Pappus's centroid theorem, giving:

$$\begin{align}
A &= \left( 2\pi r \right) \left(2 \pi R \right) = 4 \pi^2 R r, \\[5mu]
V &= \left ( \pi r^2 \right ) \left( 2 \pi R \right) = 2 \pi^2 R r^2.
\end{align}$$
These formulae are the same as for a cylinder of length 2πR and radius r, obtained from cutting the tube along the plane of a small circle, and unrolling it by straightening out (rectifying) the line running around the center of the tube. The losses in surface area and volume on the inner side of the tube exactly cancel out the gains on the outer side.

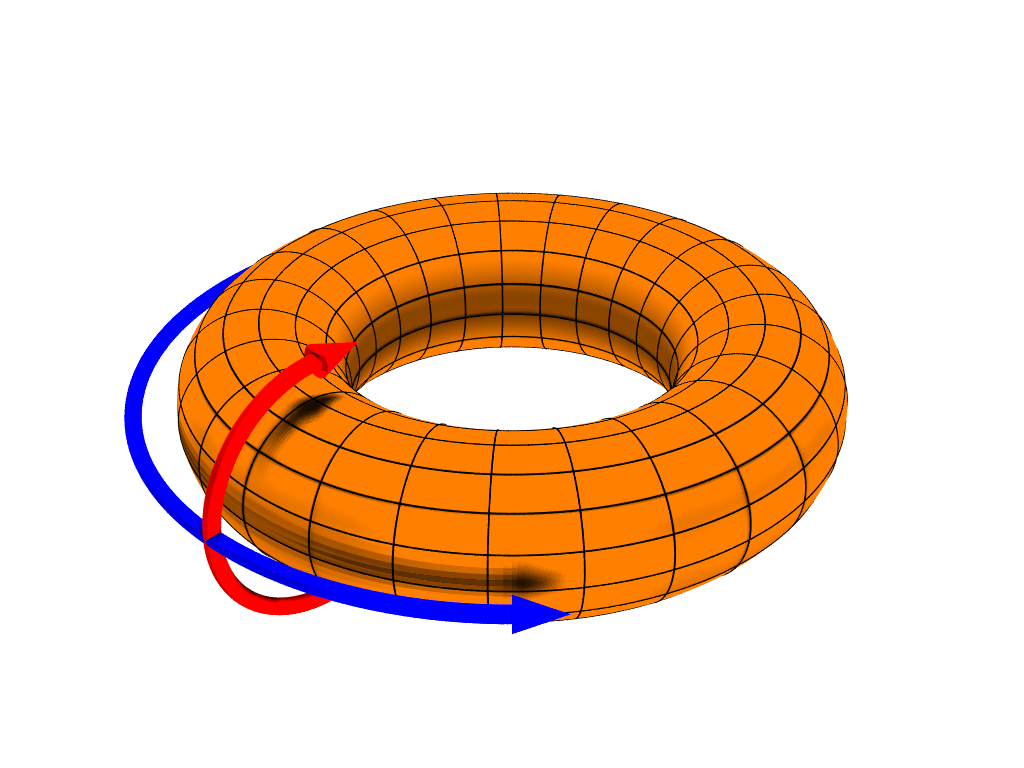
Poloidal direction (red arrow) and toroidal direction (blue arrow)

Expressing the surface area and the volume by the distance p of an outermost point on the surface of the torus to the center, and the distance q of an innermost point to the center (so that R = (p + q)/2 and r = (p − q)/2), yields
$$\begin{align}
A &= 4 \pi^2 \left(\frac{p+q}{2}\right) \left(\frac{p-q}{2}\right) = \pi^2 (p+q) (p-q), \\[5mu]
V &= 2 \pi^2 \left(\frac{p+q}{2}\right) \left(\frac{p-q}{2}\right)^2 = \tfrac14 \pi^2 (p+q) (p-q)^2.
\end{align}$$
As a torus is the product of two circles, a modified version of the spherical coordinate system is sometimes used. In traditional spherical coordinates there are three measures, R, the distance from the center of the coordinate system, and θ and φ, angles measured from the center point.

As a torus has, effectively, two center points, the centerpoints of the angles are moved; φ measures the same angle as it does in the spherical system, but is known as the "toroidal" direction. The center point of θ is moved to the center of r, and is known as the "poloidal" direction. These terms were first used in a discussion of the Earth's magnetic field, where "poloidal" was used to denote "the direction toward the poles".

In modern use, toroidal and poloidal are more commonly used to discuss magnetic confinement fusion devices.

=== Differential geometry for the ring torus ===
Using the parametrization of the torus given at the beginning of the section, it is straight forward to compute various common objects of differential calculus for the ring torus because it is not a self-intersecting surface. The partial angular velocity fields are given as,

$v_\varphi = (-(R + r \sin\theta) \sin\varphi,\,(R + r\sin\theta)\cos\varphi,\,0)$,

$v_\theta = (r\cos\theta\cos\varphi,\,r\cos\theta\sin\varphi,\,-r\sin\theta)$.

The transpose of the Jacobian matrix, $J^{\rm T}$, is given by,

$$J^{\rm T} = \begin{pmatrix}
\cos\varphi\sin\theta & \sin\varphi\sin\theta & \cos\theta \\
r\cos\varphi\cos\theta & r\sin\varphi\cos\theta & -r\sin\theta \\
-(R+r\sin\theta)\sin\varphi & (R+r\sin\theta)\cos\varphi & 0
\end{pmatrix}$$.

The Jacobian matrix determinant, $|J^{\rm T}| = |J|$, can then be computed as the Euclidean norm (magnitude) of the cross product of $v_\varphi$ with $v_\theta$ as, $|J| = \|v_\varphi\times v_\theta\|$. The result is $|J| = r(R+r\sin\theta)$. From this expression, one can then compute the surface area, and the volume by integrating $|J|$ over the coordinates of the ring torus's defined ranges: $0\leq\theta\leq 2\pi$, $R = \text{constant}$, $0\leq\varphi\leq 2\pi$, and $R > r\geq 0$.

$A_{\rm surface} = \int\limits_0^{2\pi}\int\limits_0^{2\pi} r(R+r\sin\theta)\;\; d\theta\; d\varphi = 4\pi^2Rr$.

$V = \int\limits_0^r\int\limits_0^{2\pi}\int\limits_0^{2\pi} r'(R+r'\sin\theta)\quad d\theta\; d\varphi\; dr' = 2\pi^2Rr^2$.

The usual differential operators of vector calculus can be calculated using the same parametrization to obtain their ring toroidal forms. For example, the Laplace operator for the ring torus, with the same variable ranges as for the integrals above, is given by the expression below.

$\nabla^2f(r,\,\theta,\,\phi) = \frac{\partial^2 f}{\partial r^2} + \frac{R+2r\sin\theta}{r(R+r\sin\theta)}\frac{\partial f}{\partial r} + \frac{1}{r^2}\frac{\partial^2 f}{\partial \theta^2} + \frac{\cos\theta}{r(R+r\sin\theta)}\frac{\partial f}{\partial\theta} + \frac{1}{(R+r\sin\theta)^2}\frac{\partial^2 f}{\partial \varphi^2}$

The metric tensor can be calculated as $g = J^{\rm T}J$. The result is,

$$g = \begin{pmatrix}
1 & 0 & 0 \\
0 & r^2 & 0 \\
0 & 0 & (R+r\sin\theta)^2
\end{pmatrix}$$.

One can check that the square root of the determinant of the metric tensor is equal to the determinant of the Jacobi matrix, i.e. $\sqrt{|g|} = |J|$.

== Topology ==
Topologically, a torus is a closed surface defined as the product of two circles: S^{1} × S^{1}. This can be viewed as lying in C^{2} and is a subset of the 3-sphere S^{3} of radius √2. This topological torus is also often called the Clifford torus. In fact, S^{3} is filled out by a family of nested tori in this manner (with two degenerate circles), a fact that is important in the study of S^{3} as a fiber bundle over S^{2} (the Hopf bundle).

The surface described above, given the relative topology from R^{3}, is homeomorphic to a topological torus as long as it does not intersect its own axis. A particular homeomorphism is given by stereographically projecting the topological torus into R^{3} from the north pole of S^{3}.

The torus can also be described as a quotient of the Cartesian plane under the identifications
$$(x,y) \sim (x+1,y) \sim (x,y+1), \,$$
or, equivalently, as the quotient of the unit square by pasting the opposite edges together, described as a fundamental polygon ABA^{−1}B^{−1}.

Turning a punctured torus inside-out

The fundamental group of the torus is just the direct product of the fundamental group of the circle with itself:

$\pi_1(T^2) = \pi_1(S^1) \times \pi_1(S^1) \cong \mathrm{Z} \times \mathrm{Z}.$

Intuitively speaking, this means that a closed path that circles the torus's "hole" (say, a circle that traces out a particular latitude) and then circles the torus's "body" (say, a circle that traces out a particular longitude) can be deformed to a path that circles the body and then the hole. So, strictly 'latitudinal' and strictly 'longitudinal' paths commute. An equivalent statement may be imagined as two shoelaces passing through each other, then unwinding, then rewinding.

The fundamental group can also be derived from taking the torus as the quotient $T^2\cong \mathbb{R}^2/\mathbb{Z}^2$ (see below), so that $\mathbb{R}^2$ may be taken as its universal cover, with deck transformation group $\mathbb{Z}^2=\pi_1(T^2)$.

Its higher homotopy groups are all trivial, since a universal cover projection $p:\widetilde{X}\rightarrow X$ always induces isomorphisms between the groups $\pi_n(\widetilde{X})$ and $\pi_n(X)$ for $n>1$, and $\mathbb{R}^2$ is contractible.

The torus has homology groups:

$$H_n(T^2)=\begin{cases}\mathbb{Z},& n=0,2\\
\mathbb{Z}\oplus \mathbb{Z},& n=1\\
0&\text{else.}\end{cases}$$

Thus, the first homology group of the torus is isomorphic to its fundamental group-- which in particular can be deduced from the Hurewicz theorem since $\pi_1(T^2)$ is abelian.

The cohomology groups with integer coefficients are isomorphic to the homology ones-- which can be seen either by direct computation, the universal coefficient theorem or even Poincaré duality.

If a torus is punctured and turned inside out then another torus results, with lines of latitude and longitude interchanged. This is equivalent to building a torus from a cylinder, by joining the circular ends together, in two ways: around the outside like joining two ends of a garden hose, or through the inside like rolling a sock (with the toe cut off). Additionally, if the cylinder was made by gluing two opposite sides of a rectangle together, choosing the other two sides instead will cause the same reversal of orientation.

== Two-sheeted cover ==
The 2-torus is a twofold branched cover of the 2-sphere, with four ramification points. Every conformal structure on the 2-torus can be represented as such a two-sheeted cover of the 2-sphere. The points on the torus corresponding to the ramification points are the Weierstrass points. In fact, the conformal type of the torus is determined by the cross-ratio of the four points.

== n-dimensional torus ==
A stereographic projection of a Clifford torus in four dimensions performing a simple rotation through the xz-plane

The torus has a generalization to higher dimensions, the n-dimensional torus, often called the n-torus or hypertorus for short. (This is the more typical meaning of the term "n-torus", the other referring to n holes or of genus n.) Just as the ordinary torus is topologically the product space of two circles, the n-dimensional torus is topologically equivalent to the product of n circles. That is:
$$T^n = \underbrace{S^1 \times \cdots \times S^1}_n.$$

The standard 1-torus is just the circle: T^{1} = S^{1}. The torus discussed above is the standard 2-torus, T^{2}. And similar to the 2-torus, the n-torus, T^{n} can be described as a quotient of R^{n} under integral shifts in any coordinate. That is, the n-torus is R^{n} modulo the action of the integer lattice Z^{n} (with the action being taken as vector addition). Equivalently, the n-torus is obtained from the n-dimensional hypercube by gluing the opposite faces together.

An n-torus in this sense is an example of an n-dimensional compact manifold. It is also an example of a compact abelian Lie group. This follows from the fact that the unit circle is a compact abelian Lie group (when identified with the unit complex numbers with multiplication). Group multiplication on the torus is then defined by coordinate-wise multiplication.

Toroidal groups play an important part in the theory of compact Lie groups. This is due in part to the fact that in any compact Lie group G one can always find a maximal torus; that is, a closed subgroup which is a torus of the largest possible dimension. Such maximal tori T have a controlling role to play in theory of connected G. Toroidal groups are examples of protori, which (like tori) are compact connected abelian groups, which are not required to be manifolds.

Automorphisms of T are easily constructed from automorphisms of the lattice Z^{n}, which are classified by invertible integral matrices of size n with an integral inverse; these are just the integral matrices with determinant ±1. Making them act on R^{n} in the usual way, one has the typical toral automorphism on the quotient.

The fundamental group of an n-torus is a free abelian group of rank n. The kth homology group of an n-torus is a free abelian group of rank n choose k. It follows that the Euler characteristic of the n-torus is 0 for all n. The cohomology ring H^{•}($T^{n}$, Z) can be identified with the exterior algebra over the Z-module Z^{n} whose generators are the duals of the n nontrivial cycles.

=== Configuration space ===
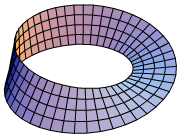
The configuration space of 2 not necessarily distinct points on the circle is the orbifold quotient of the 2-torus, T^{2} / S_{2}, which is the Möbius strip.

The Tonnetz is an example of a torus in music theory. The Tonnetz is only truly a torus if enharmonic equivalence is assumed, so that the (F♯-A♯) segment of the right edge of the repeated parallelogram is identified with the (G♭-B♭) segment of the left edge.

As the n-torus is the n-fold product of the circle, the n-torus is the configuration space of n ordered, not necessarily distinct points on the circle. Symbolically, T^{n} = (S^{1})^{n}. The configuration space of unordered, not necessarily distinct points is accordingly the orbifold T^{n} / S^{n}, which is the quotient of the torus by the symmetric group on n letters (by permuting the coordinates).

For n = 2, the quotient is the Möbius strip, the edge corresponding to the orbifold points where the two coordinates coincide. For n = 3 this quotient may be described as a solid torus with cross-section an equilateral triangle, with a twist; equivalently, as a triangular prism whose top and bottom faces are connected with a 1/3 twist (120°): the 3-dimensional interior corresponds to the points on the 3-torus where all 3 coordinates are distinct, the 2-dimensional face corresponds to points with 2 coordinates equal and the 3rd different, while the 1-dimensional edge corresponds to points with all 3 coordinates identical.

These orbifolds have found significant applications to music theory in the work of Dmitri Tymoczko and collaborators (Felipe Posada, Michael Kolinas, et al.), being used to model musical triads.

== Flat torus ==
In three dimensions, one can bend a rectangle into a torus, but doing this necessarily affects the distances measured along the surface, as seen by the distortion of the checkered pattern.

Seen in stereographic projection, a 4D flat torus can be projected into 3-dimensions and rotated on a fixed axis.

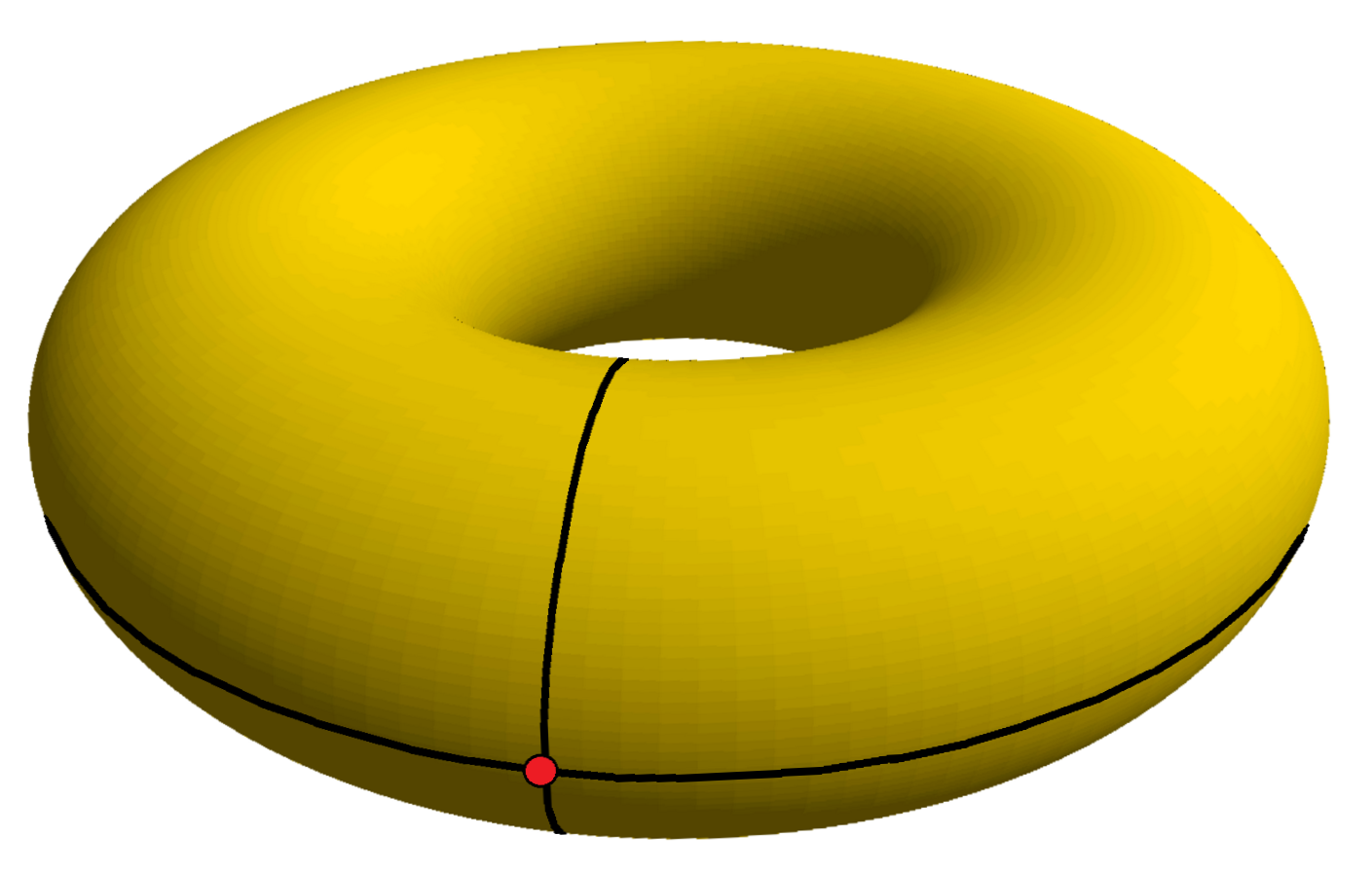
The simplest tiling of a flat torus is {4,4}_{1,0}, constructed on the surface of a duocylinder with 1 vertex, 2 orthogonal edges, and one square face. It is seen here stereographically projected into 3-space as a torus.

A flat torus is a torus with the metric inherited from its representation as the quotient, R^{2} / L, where L is a discrete subgroup of R^{2} isomorphic to Z^{2}. This gives the quotient the structure of a Riemannian manifold, as well as the structure of an abelian Lie group. Perhaps the simplest example of this is when L = Z^{2}: R^{2} / Z^{2}, which can also be described as the Cartesian plane under the identifications (x, y) ~ (x + 1, y) ~ (x, y + 1). This particular flat torus (and any uniformly scaled version of it) is known as the square flat torus.

This metric of the square flat torus can also be realised by specific embeddings of the familiar 2-torus into Euclidean 4-space or higher dimensions. Its surface has zero Gaussian curvature everywhere. It is flat in the same sense that the surface of a cylinder is flat. In 3 dimensions, one can bend a flat sheet of paper into a cylinder without stretching the paper, but this cylinder cannot be bent into a torus without stretching the paper (unless some regularity and differentiability conditions are given up, see below).

A simple 4-dimensional Euclidean embedding of a rectangular flat torus (more general than the square one) is as follows:
$$(x,y,z,w) = (R\cos u, R\sin u, P\cos v, P\sin v)$$
where R and P are positive constants determining the aspect ratio. It is diffeomorphic to a regular torus but not isometric. It can not be analytically embedded (smooth of class C^{k}, 2 ≤ k ≤ ∞) into Euclidean 3-space. Mapping it into 3-space requires one to stretch it, in which case it looks like a regular torus. For example, in the following map:
$$(x,y,z) = ((R+P\sin v)\cos u, (R+P\sin v)\sin u, P\cos v).$$

If R and P in the above flat torus parametrization form a unit vector (R, P) = (cos(η), sin(η)) then u, v, and 0 < η < π/2 parameterize the unit 3-sphere as Hopf coordinates. In particular, for certain very specific choices of a square flat torus in the 3-sphere S^{3}, where η = π/4 above, the torus will partition the 3-sphere into two congruent solid tori subsets with the aforesaid flat torus surface as their common boundary. One example is the torus T defined by
$$T = \left\{ (x,y,z,w) \in S^3 \mid x^2+y^2 = \frac 1 2, \ z^2+w^2 = \frac 1 2 \right\}.$$

Other tori in S^{3} having this partitioning property include the square tori of the form Q ⋅ T, where Q is a rotation of 4-dimensional space R^{4}, or in other words Q is a member of the Lie group SO(4).

It is known that there exists no C^{2} (twice continuously differentiable) embedding of a flat torus into 3-space. (The idea of the proof is to take a large sphere containing such a flat torus in its interior, and shrink the radius of the sphere until it just touches the torus for the first time. Such a point of contact must be a tangency. But that would imply that part of the torus, since it has zero curvature everywhere, must lie strictly outside the sphere, which is a contradiction.) On the other hand, according to the Nash-Kuiper theorem, which was proven in the 1950s, an isometric C^{1} embedding exists. This is solely an existence proof and does not provide explicit equations for such an embedding.

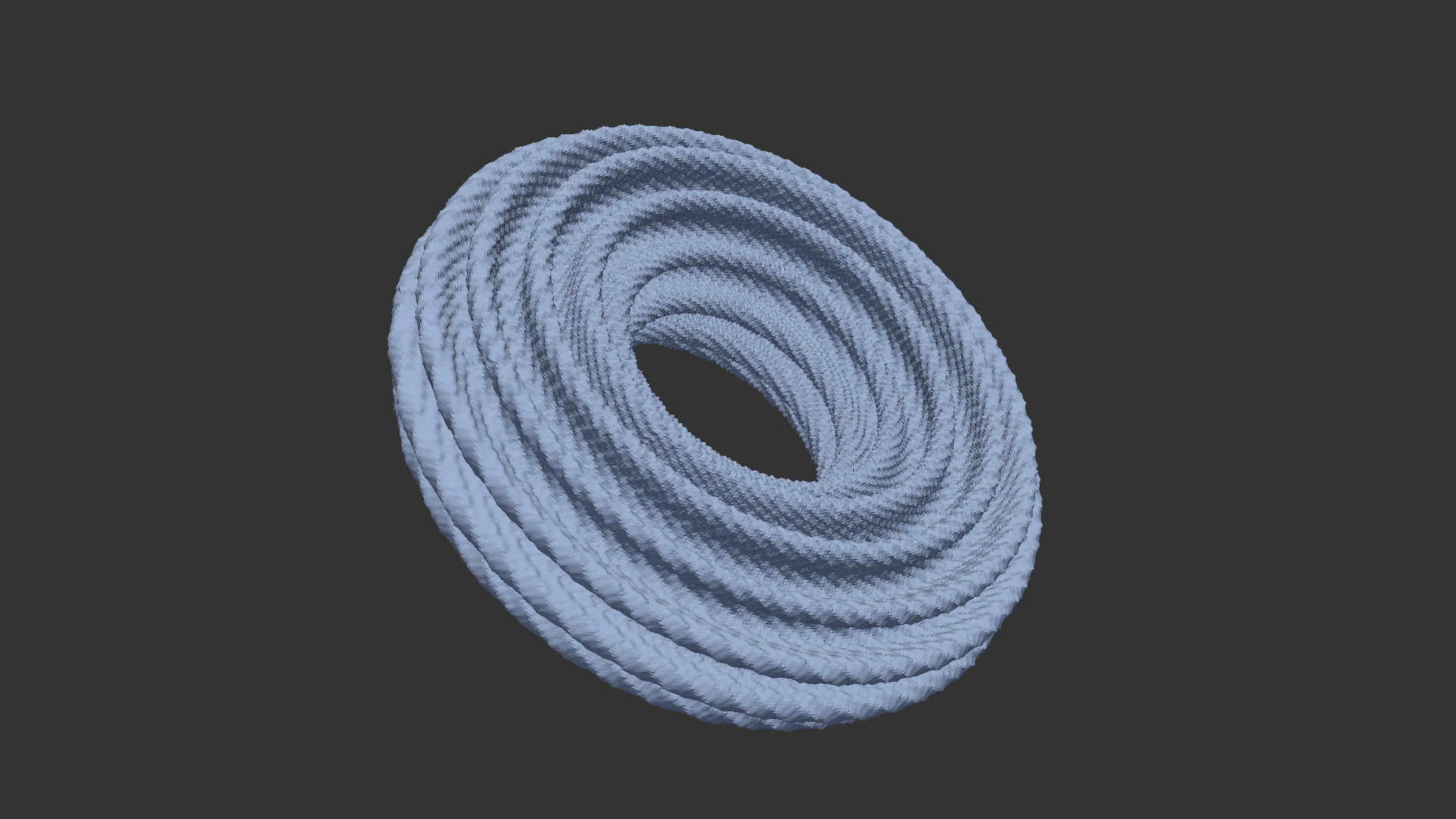
$C^1$ isometric embedding of a flat torus in R^{3}, with corrugations

In April 2012, an explicit C^{1} (continuously differentiable) isometric embedding of a flat torus into 3-dimensional Euclidean space R^{3} was found. It is a flat torus in the sense that, as a metric space, it is isometric to a flat square torus. It is similar in structure to a fractal as it is constructed by repeatedly corrugating an ordinary torus at smaller scales. Like fractals, it has no defined Gaussian curvature. However, unlike fractals, it does have defined surface normals, yielding a so-called "smooth fractal". The key to obtaining the smoothness of this corrugated torus is to have the amplitudes of successive corrugations decreasing faster than their "wavelengths". (These infinitely recursive corrugations are used only for embedding into three dimensions; they are not an intrinsic feature of the flat torus.) This is the first time that any such embedding was defined by explicit equations or depicted by computer graphics.

=== Conformal classification of flat tori ===
In the study of Riemann surfaces, one says that any two smooth compact geometric surfaces are "conformally equivalent" when there exists a smooth homeomorphism between them that is both angle-preserving and orientation-preserving. The Uniformization theorem guarantees that every Riemann surface is conformally equivalent to one that has constant Gaussian curvature. In the case of a torus, the constant curvature must be zero. Then one defines the "moduli space" of the torus to contain one point for each conformal equivalence class, with the appropriate topology. It turns out that this moduli space M may be identified with a punctured sphere that is smooth except for two points that have less angle than 2π (radians) around them: One has total angle π and the other has total angle 2π/3.

M may be turned into a compact space M* – topologically equivalent to a sphere – by adding one additional point that represents the limiting case as a rectangular torus approaches an aspect ratio of 0 in the limit. The result is that this compactified moduli space is a sphere with three points each having less than 2π total angle around them. (Such a point is termed a "cusp", and may be thought of as the vertex of a cone, also called a "conepoint".) This third conepoint will have zero total angle around it. Due to symmetry, M* may be constructed by glueing together two congruent geodesic triangles in the hyperbolic plane along their (identical) boundaries, where each triangle has angles of π/2, π/3, and 0. (The three angles of a hyperbolic triangle T determine T up to congruence.) As a result, the Gauss–Bonnet theorem shows that the area of each triangle can be calculated as π − (π/2 + π/3 + 0) = π/6, so it follows that the compactified moduli space M* has area equal to π/3.

The other two cusps occur at the points corresponding in M* to (a) the square torus (total angle π) and (b) the hexagonal torus (total angle 2π/3). These are the only conformal equivalence classes of flat tori that have any conformal automorphisms other than those generated by translations and negation.

== Genus g surface ==
In the theory of surfaces there is a more general family of objects, the "genus" g surfaces. A genus g surface is the connected sum of g two-tori. (And so the torus itself is the surface of genus 1.) To form a connected sum of two surfaces, remove from each the interior of a disk and "glue" the surfaces together along the boundary circles. (That is, merge the two boundary circles so they become just one circle.) To form the connected sum of more than two surfaces, successively take the connected sum of two of them at a time until they are all connected. In this sense, a genus g surface resembles the surface of g doughnuts stuck together side by side, or a 2-sphere with g handles attached.

As examples, a genus zero surface (without boundary) is the two-sphere while a genus one surface (without boundary) is the ordinary torus. The surfaces of higher genus are sometimes called n-holed tori (or, rarely, n-fold tori). The terms double torus and triple torus are also occasionally used.

The classification theorem for surfaces states that every compact connected surface is topologically equivalent to either the sphere or the connect sum of some number of tori, disks, and real projective planes.

genus two	genus three

== Toroidal polyhedra ==
A toroidal polyhedron with 6 × 4 = 24 quadrilateral faces

Polyhedra with the topological type of a torus are called toroidal polyhedra, and have Euler characteristic V − E + F = 0. For any number of holes, the formula generalizes to V − E + F = 2 − 2g, where g is the topological genus.

Toroidal polyhedra have been used to show that the maximum number of colors to color a map on a torus is seven. The Szilassi polyhedron is one example of a toroidal polyhedron with this property.

The Szilassi polyhedron's dual, the Császár polyhedron, is the only polyhedron other than the tetrahedron which has the property that every possible edge connecting two vertices is an edge of the polyhedron.

The term "toroidal polyhedron" is also used for higher-genus polyhedra and for immersions of toroidal polyhedra, although some authors only include those with genus 1.

Self-crossing toroidal polyhedra are determined by the topology of their abstract manifold. One subset of the self-crossing toroidal polyhedra are the crown polyhedra, which are the only toroidal polyhedra that are also noble.

== Automorphisms ==
The homeomorphism group (or the subgroup of diffeomorphisms) of the torus is studied in geometric topology. Its mapping class group (the connected components of the homeomorphism group) is surjective onto the group $\operatorname{GL}(n,\mathbf{Z})$ of invertible integer matrices, which can be realized as linear maps on the universal covering space $\mathbf{R}^{n}$ that preserve the standard lattice $\mathbf{Z}^{n}$ (this corresponds to integer coefficients) and thus descend to the quotient.

At the level of homotopy and homology, the mapping class group can be identified as the action on the first homology (or equivalently, first cohomology, or on the fundamental group, as these are all naturally isomorphic; also the first cohomology group generates the cohomology algebra:
$$\operatorname{MCG}_{\operatorname{Ho}}(T^n) = \operatorname{Aut}(\pi_1(X)) = \operatorname{Aut}(\mathbf{Z}^n) = \operatorname{GL}(n,\mathbf{Z}).$$

Since the torus is an Eilenberg–MacLane space K(G, 1), its homotopy equivalences, up to homotopy, can be identified with automorphisms of the fundamental group); all homotopy equivalences of the torus can be realized by homeomorphisms – every homotopy equivalence is homotopic to a homeomorphism.

Thus the short exact sequence of the mapping class group splits (an identification of the torus as the quotient of $\mathbf{R}^{n}$ gives a splitting, via the linear maps, as above):
$$1 \to \operatorname{Homeo}_0(T^n) \to \operatorname{Homeo}(T^n) \to \operatorname{MCG}_{\operatorname{TOP}}(T^n) \to 1.$$

The mapping class group of higher genus surfaces is much more complicated, and an area of active research.

== Coloring a torus ==
The torus's Heawood number is seven, meaning every graph that can be embedded on the torus has a chromatic number of at most seven. (Since the complete graph $\mathsf{K_7}$ can be embedded on the torus, and $\chi (\mathsf{K_7}) = 7$, the upper bound is tight.) Equivalently, in a torus divided into regions, it is always possible to color the regions using no more than seven colors so that no neighboring regions are the same color. (Contrast with the four color theorem for the plane.)

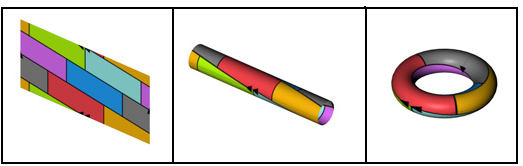
This construction shows the torus divided into seven regions, every one of which touches every other, meaning each must be assigned a unique color.

== de Bruijn torus ==
STL model of de Bruijn torus (16,32;3,3)_{2} with 1s as panels and 0s as holes in the mesh – with consistent orientation, every 3×3 matrix appears exactly once

In combinatorial mathematics, a de Bruijn torus is an array of symbols from an alphabet (often just 0 and 1) that contains every m-by-n matrix exactly once. It is a torus because the edges are considered wraparound for the purpose of finding matrices. Its name comes from the de Bruijn sequence, which can be considered a special case where n is 1 (one dimension).

== Cutting a torus ==
A solid torus of revolution can be cut by n (> 0) planes into at most
$$\begin{pmatrix}n+2 \\ n-1\end{pmatrix} +\begin{pmatrix}n \\ n-1\end{pmatrix} = \tfrac{1}{6}(n^3 + 3n^2 + 8n)$$
parts. (This assumes the pieces may not be rearranged but must remain in place for all cuts.)

The first 11 numbers of parts, for 0 ≤ n ≤ 10 (including the case of n = 0, not covered by the above formulas), are as follows:

1, 2, 6, 13, 24, 40, 62, 91, 128, 174, 230, ... (sequence A003600 in the OEIS).

== See also ==
- 3-torus
- Algebraic torus
- Angenent torus
- Annulus (geometry)
- Clifford torus
- Complex torus
- Dupin cyclide
- Elliptic curve
- Irrational winding of a torus
- Joint European Torus
- Klein bottle
- Loewner's torus inequality
- Maximal torus
- Period lattice
- Real projective plane
- Sphere
- Spiric section
- Surface (topology)
- Tokamak
- Toric lens
- Toric section
- Toric variety
- Toroid
- Toroidal and poloidal
- Torus-based cryptography
- Torus knot
- Umbilic torus
- Villarceau circles

== Notes ==
- Nociones de Geometría Analítica y Álgebra Lineal, ISBN 978-970-10-6596-9, Author: Kozak Ana Maria, Pompeya Pastorelli Sonia, Verdanega Pedro Emilio, Editorial: McGraw-Hill, Edition 2007, 744 pages, language: Spanish
- Allen Hatcher. Algebraic Topology. Cambridge University Press, 2002. ISBN 0-521-79540-0.
- V. V. Nikulin, I. R. Shafarevich. Geometries and Groups. Springer, 1987. ISBN 3-540-15281-4, ISBN 978-3-540-15281-1.
- "Tore (notion géométrique)" at Encyclopédie des Formes Mathématiques Remarquables
