= Noble polyhedron =

Isohedral and isogonal polyhedron

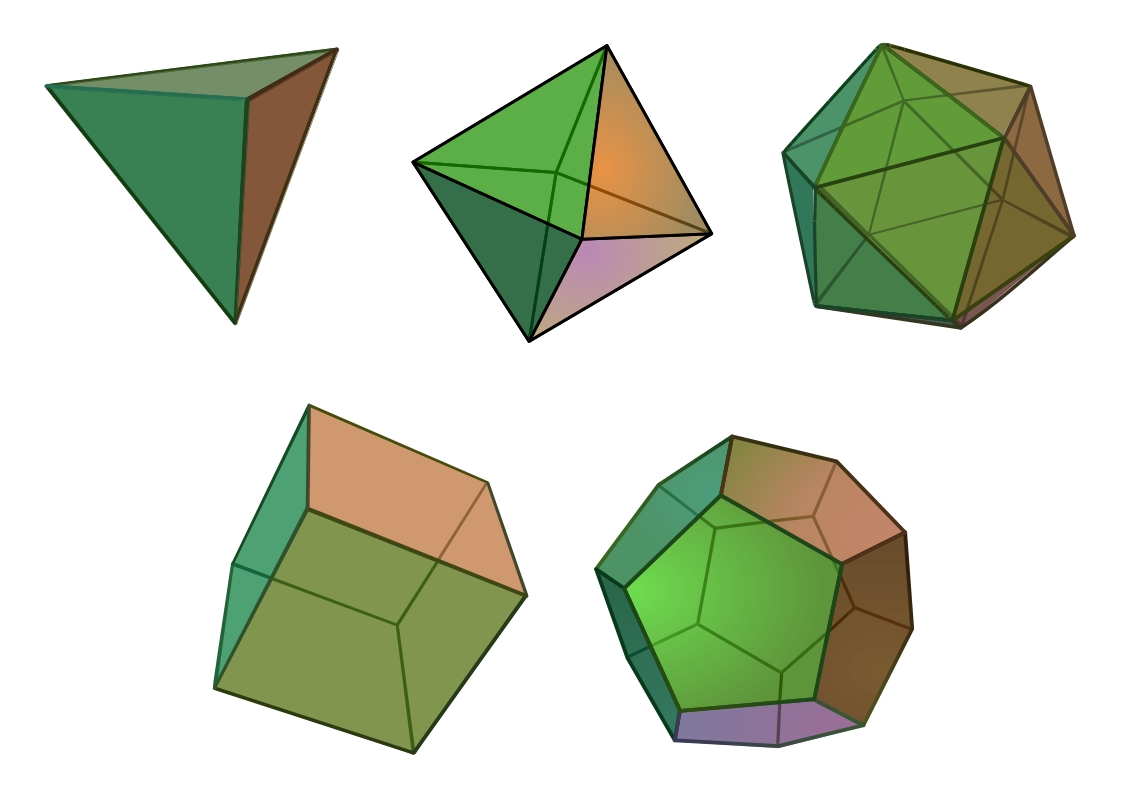
Examples of noble polyhedra. Top left to right: tetrahedron, octahedron, and icosahedron. Bottom left to right: cube and dodecahedron.

A noble polyhedron is one which is isohedral (all faces the same) and isogonal (all vertices the same). They were first studied in any depth by Edmund Hess and Max Brückner in the late 19th century, and later by Branko Grünbaum.

== Classes of noble polyhedra ==
There are several main classes of noble polyhedra:

- Regular polyhedra, that is, the five Platonic solids and the four Kepler–Poinsot polyhedra.
- Disphenoid tetrahedra.
- Crown polyhedra, also known as stephanoid polyhedra.
- A variety of miscellaneous examples, e.g. the stellated icosahedra D and H, or their duals.

If we allow some of Grünbaum's stranger constructions as polyhedra, then we have two more infinite series of toroids (besides the crown polyhedra mentioned above):

- Wreath polyhedra. These have triangular faces in coplanar pairs which share an edge.
- V-faced polyhedra. These have vertices in coincident pairs and degenerate faces.

== Duality of noble polyhedra ==
We can distinguish between dual structural forms (topologies) on the one hand, and dual geometrical arrangements when reciprocated about a concentric sphere, on the other. Where the distinction is not made below, the term 'dual' covers both kinds.

The dual of a noble polyhedron is also noble. Many are also self-dual:

- The five regular polyhedra form dual pairs, with the tetrahedron being self-dual.
- The disphenoid tetrahedra are all topologically identical. Geometrically they come in dual pairs – one elongated, and one correspondingly squashed.
- A crown polyhedron is topologically self-dual. It does not seem to be known whether any geometrically self-dual examples exist.
- The wreath and V-faced polyhedra are dual to each other.

== Generating other noble polyhedra ==
In 2008, Robert Webb discovered a new noble polyhedron, a faceting of the snub cube. This was the first new class of noble polyhedra (with chiral octahedral symmetry) to be discovered since Brückner's work over a century before.

In 2020, Ulrich Mikloweit generated 52 noble polyhedra by extending isohedral facetings of uniform polyhedra, of which 24 were already described by Brückner and 19 were entirely new.

In 2026, Connor Hill received the top prize in the 2026 Regeneron Talent Search for a computational proof that all noble polyhedra consist of two infinite families and 146 additional instances.
