= August Ferdinand Möbius =

German mathematician and astronomer (1790–1868)

August Möbius
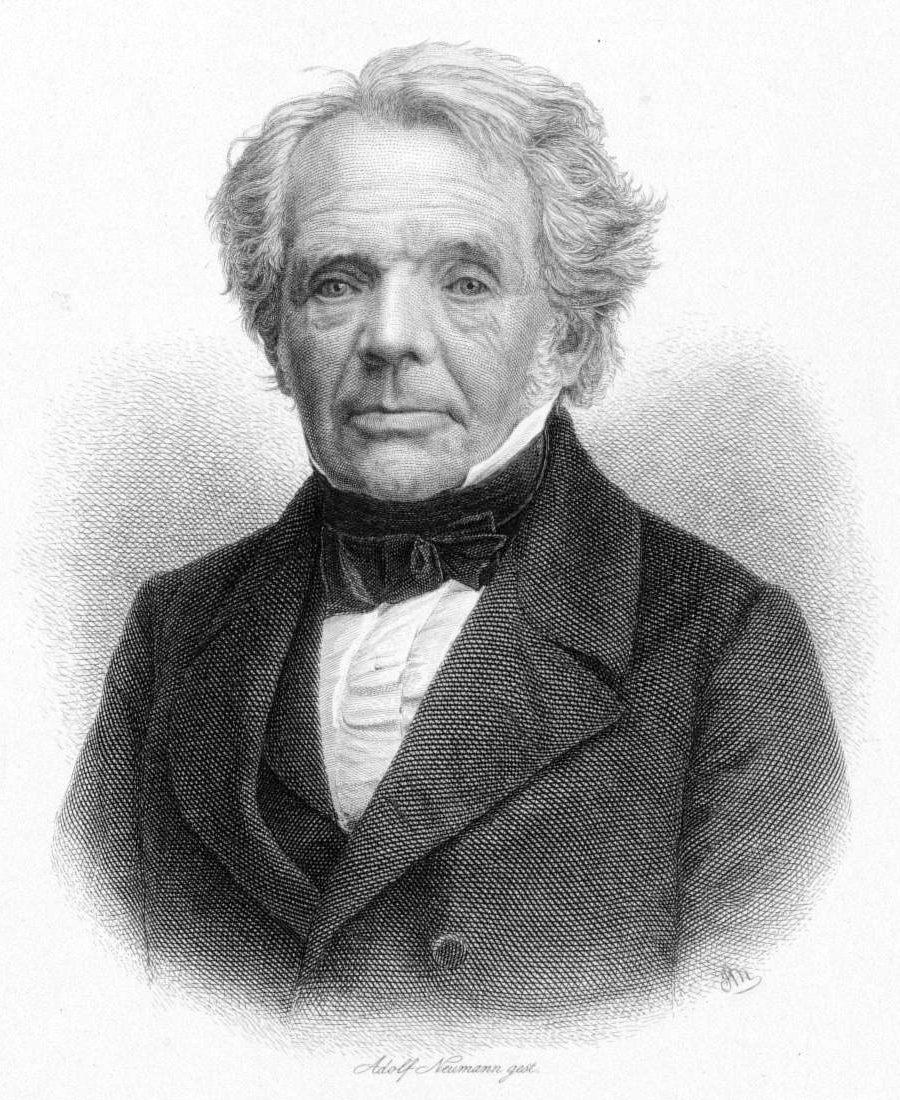
- Engraving of Möbius by Adolf Neumann, c. 1850
- Born: August Ferdinand Möbius; 17 November 1790; Schulpforta, Electorate of Saxony, Holy Roman Empire
- Died: 26 September 1868 (aged 77); Leipzig, Kingdom of Saxony, North German Confederation
- Education: University of Leipzig; University of Göttingen; University of Halle
- Known for: Möbius strip; Möbius transformations; Möbius transform; Möbius function; Möbius inversion formula; Möbius configuration; Möbius–Kantor configuration; Möbius–Kantor graph
- Scientific career
- Fields: Mathematics
- Workplaces: University of Leipzig
- Doctoral advisor: Johann Pfaff
- Other academic advisors: Carl Friedrich Gauss; Karl Mollweide
- Doctoral students: Otto Wilhelm Fiedler
- Other notable students: Hermann Hankel

August Ferdinand Möbius (UK: /ˈmɜːbiəs/, US: /ˈmeɪ-, ˈmoʊ-/; German: [ˈmøːbi̯ʊs]; 17 November 1790 – 26 September 1868) was a German mathematician and theoretical astronomer.

== Life and education ==
Möbius was born in Schulpforta, Electorate of Saxony, and was descended on his mother's side from religious reformer Martin Luther. He was home-schooled until he was 13, when he attended the college in Schulpforta in 1803, and studied there, graduating in 1809. He then enrolled at the University of Leipzig, where he studied astronomy under the mathematician and astronomer Karl Mollweide. In 1813, he began to study astronomy under mathematician Carl Friedrich Gauss at the University of Göttingen, while Gauss was the director of the Göttingen Observatory. From there, he went to study with Carl Gauss's instructor, Johann Pfaff, at the University of Halle, where he completed his doctoral thesis The occultation of fixed stars in 1815. In 1816, he was appointed as Extraordinary Professor to the "chair of astronomy and higher mechanics" at the University of Leipzig. Möbius died in Leipzig in 1868 at the age of 77.

His son Theodor was a noted philologist.

== Contributions ==
He is best known for his discovery of the Möbius strip, a non-orientable two-dimensional surface with only one side when embedded in three-dimensional Euclidean space. It was independently discovered by Johann Benedict Listing a few months earlier. The Möbius configuration, formed by two mutually inscribed tetrahedra, is also named after him. Möbius was the first to introduce homogeneous coordinates into projective geometry. He is recognized for the introduction of the barycentric coordinate system. Before 1853 and Schläfli's discovery of the 4-polytopes, Möbius (with Cayley and Grassmann) was one of only three other people who had also conceived of the possibility of geometry in more than three dimensions.

Many mathematical concepts are named after him, including the Möbius plane, the Möbius transformations, important in projective geometry, and the Möbius transform of number theory. His interest in number theory led to the important Möbius function μ(n) and the Möbius inversion formula. In Euclidean geometry, he systematically developed the use of signed angles and line segments as a way of simplifying and unifying results.

== Collected works ==
- Gesammelte Werke erster Band (v. 1) (Leipzig : S. Hirzel, 1885)
- Gesammelte Werke zweiter Band (v. 2) (Leipzig : S. Hirzel, 1885)
- Gesammelte Werke dritter Band (v. 3) (Leipzig : S. Hirzel, 1885)
- Gesammelte Werke vierter Band (v. 4) (Leipzig : S. Hirzel, 1885)
- Die elemente der mechanik des himmels, auf neuem wege ohne hülfe höherer rechnungsarten dargestellt von August Ferdinand Möbius (Leipzig, Weidmann'sche buchhandlung, 1843)
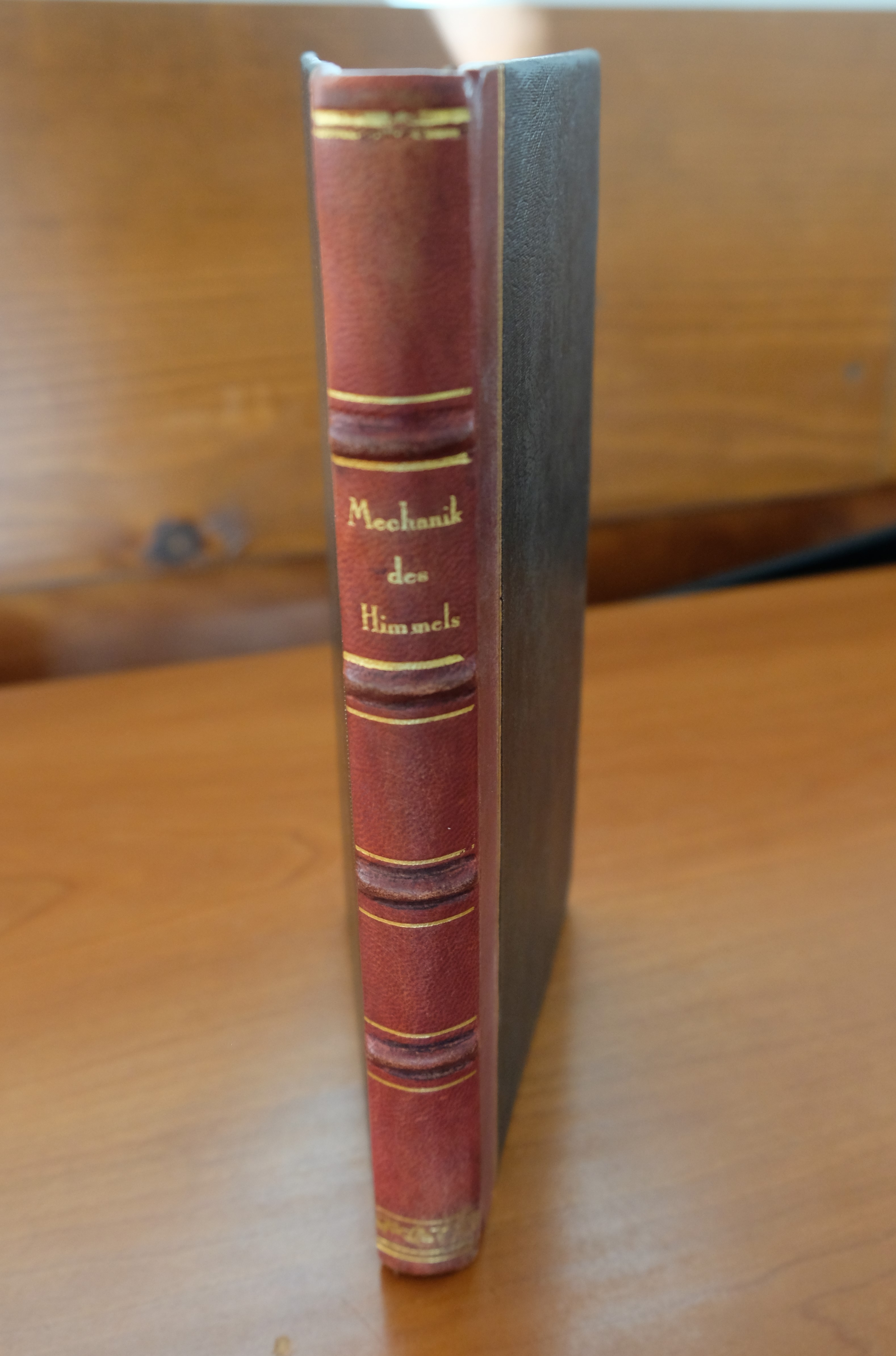
1843 copy of Die Elemente der Mechanik des Himmels

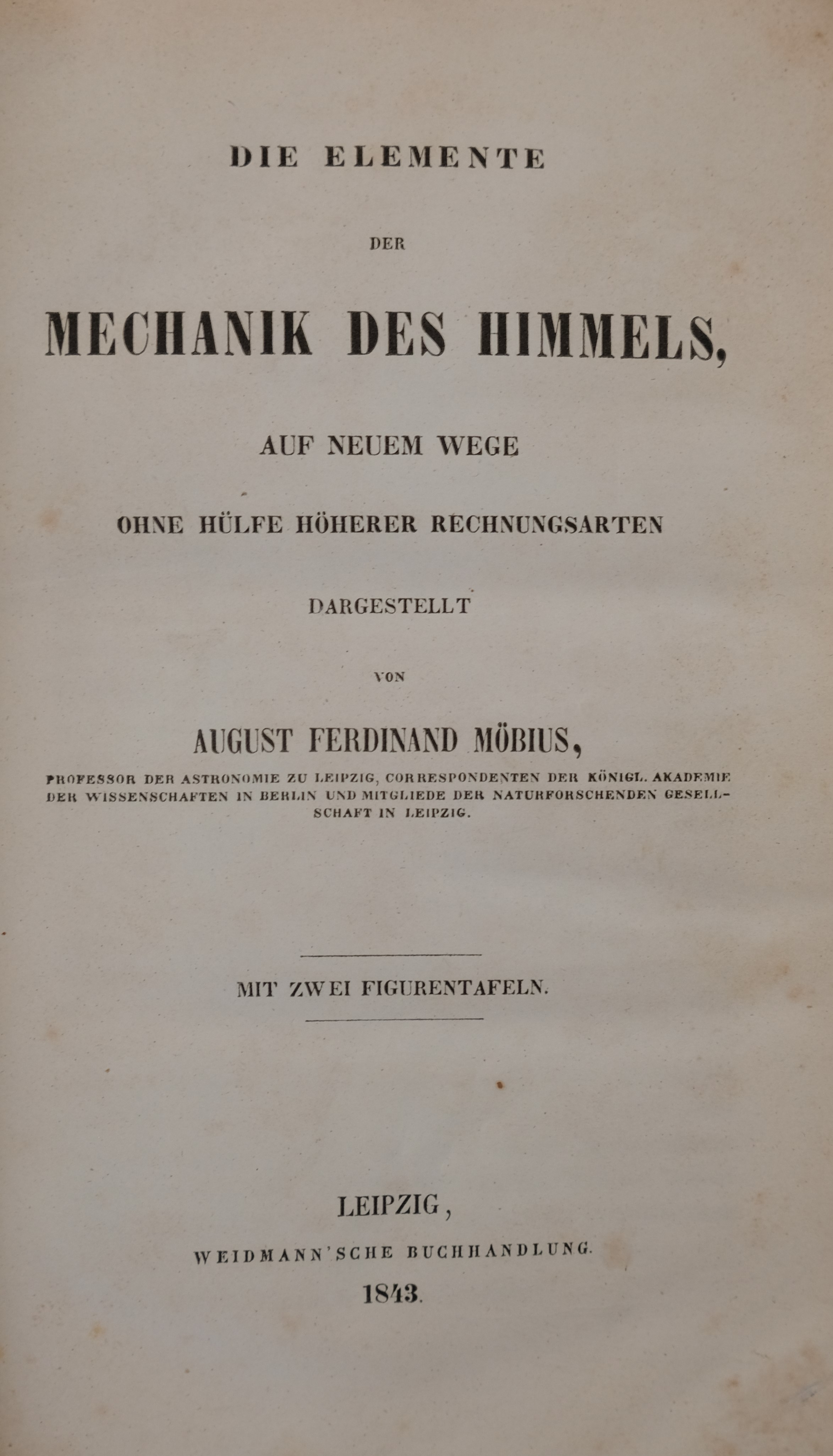
Title page to a 1843 copy of Die Elemente der Mechanik des Himmels

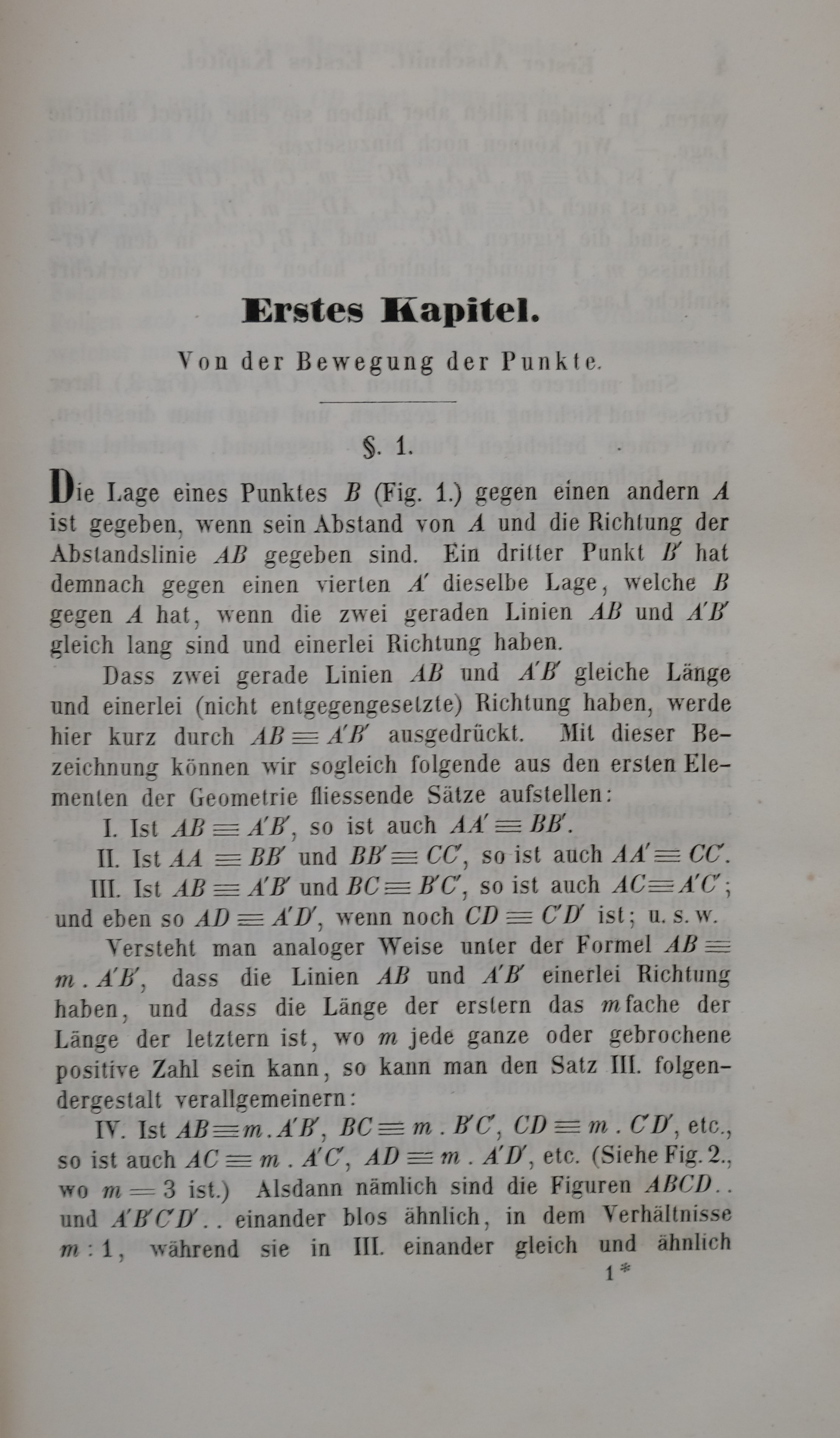
First page to a 1843 copy of Die Elemente der Mechanik des Himmels

== See also ==
- Barycentric coordinate system
- Collineation
- Homogeneous coordinates
- Möbius counter
- Möbius plane
