= Lajos Szilassi =

Hungarian mathematician

The Szilassi polyhedron

Lajos Szilassi (born in 1942 in Szentes, Hungary) was a professor of mathematics at the University of Szeged who worked in projective and non-Euclidean geometry, applying his research to computer generated solutions to geometric problems.

== Biography ==
Szilassi obtained his undergraduate degree in 1966 at the Bolyai Institute of the József Attila University, majoring in mathematical representation geometry. He taught for six years in a secondary school before joining the Department of Mathematics at Gyula Juhász Teacher Training College. In 1981, he received a bachelor's associate degree. He then received his Doctor rerum naturalium degree at the University of Szeged (1978) under László Lovász with the dissertation Polyhedra bounded by pairwise adjacent faces. He received his PhD in 2006.

From 1973 until he retired in 2007, he was a professor of mathematics at the University of Szeged. He worked in the areas of geometry, elementary mathematics, and computer science, with an emphasis on computer generated solutions of geometric problems.

== Szilassi polyhedron ==
In 1977, Szilassi discovered a toroidal polyhedron with seven hexagonal faces, in which each pair of faces share an edge. The new construction was soon dubbed the Szilassi polyhedron. This is mathematically significant because the tetrahedron and the Szilassi polyhedron are the only two known polyhedra in which each face shares an edge with each other face. Martin Gardner featured the Szilassi polyhedron in his November 1978 Mathematical Games column in Scientific American.

On April 29, 2002 the French government installed a sculpture of the "Szilassi-Polyhedron" in the town of Beaumont-de-Lomagne, the birthplace of Fermat, on the 400th anniversary of his birth. There are also large scale renderings of the polyhedron in Canberra, Australia and Whitehall, Michigan.
