= Szilassi polyhedron =

Toroidal polyhedron with 7 faces

- Type: Toroidal polyhedron
- Faces: 7 hexagons
- Edges: 21
- Vertices: 14
- Euler char.: 0 (Genus 1)
- Rotation group: axis of 180-degree symmetry
- Dual polyhedron: Császár polyhedron
- Properties: non-convex

In geometry, the Szilassi polyhedron is a nonconvex polyhedron, topologically a torus, with seven hexagonal faces. The tetrahedron and the Szilassi polyhedron are the only two known polyhedra in which each face shares one edge with each other face.

== Properties ==
=== Coloring and symmetry ===
STL 3D model of a Szilassi polyhedron

The 14 vertices and 21 edges of the Szilassi polyhedron form an embedding of the Heawood graph onto the surface of a torus. Each face of this polyhedron shares an edge with each other face. As a result, it requires seven colours to colour all adjacent faces. This example shows that, on surfaces topologically equivalent to a torus, some subdivisions require seven colors, providing the lower bound for the seven colour theorem. The other half of the theorem states that all toroidal subdivisions can be colored with seven or fewer colors.

The Szilassi polyhedron has an axis of 180-degree symmetry. This symmetry swaps three pairs of congruent faces, leaving one unpaired hexagon that has the same rotational symmetry as the polyhedron.

=== Complete face adjacency ===
Unsolved problem in mathematics
Is there a non-convex polyhedron without self-intersections with more than seven faces, all of which share an edge with each other?
More unsolved problems in mathematics

The tetrahedron and the Szilassi polyhedron are the only two known polyhedra in which each face shares one edge with each other face.

If a polyhedron with $f$ faces is embedded onto a surface with $h$ holes, in such a way that each face shares one edge with each other face, it follows by some manipulation of the Euler characteristic that
$$h = \frac{(f - 4)(f - 3)}{12}.$$
This equation is satisfied for the tetrahedron with $h = 0$ and $f = 4$, and for the Szilassi polyhedron with $h = 1$ and $f = 7$.

The next possible solution, $h = 6$ and $f = 12$, would correspond to a polyhedron with 44 vertices and 66 edges. However, it is not known whether such a polyhedron can be realized geometrically without self-crossings (rather than as an abstract polytope). More generally, this equation can be satisfied precisely when $f$ is congruent to 0, 3, 4, or 7 modulo 12.

== History ==
The Szilassi polyhedron is named after Hungarian mathematician Lajos Szilassi, who discovered it in 1977. The dual to the Szilassi polyhedron, the Császár polyhedron, was discovered earlier by Ákos Császár (1949); it has seven vertices, 21 edges connecting every pair of vertices, and 14 triangular faces. Like the Szilassi polyhedron, the Császár polyhedron has the topology of a torus.
