= Toroidal polyhedron =

Partition of a toroidal surface into polygons

A polyhedral torus can be constructed to approximate a torus surface, from a net of quadrilateral faces, like this 6x4 example.

In geometry, a toroidal polyhedron is a polyhedron which is also a toroid (a g-holed torus), having a topological genus (g) of 1 or greater. Notable examples include the Császár and Szilassi polyhedra.

== Variations in definition ==
Toroidal polyhedra are defined as collections of polygons that meet at their edges and vertices, forming a manifold as they do. That is, each edge should be shared by exactly two polygons, and at each vertex the edges and faces that meet at the vertex should be linked together in a single cycle of alternating edges and faces, the star of the vertex. For toroidal polyhedra, this manifold is an orientable surface. Some authors restrict the phrase "toroidal polyhedra" to mean more specifically polyhedra topologically equivalent to the (genus 1) torus.

In this area, it is important to distinguish embedded toroidal polyhedra, whose faces are flat polygons in three-dimensional Euclidean space that do not cross themselves or each other, from abstract polyhedra, topological surfaces without any specified geometric realization. Intermediate between these two extremes are polyhedra formed by geometric polygons or star polygons in Euclidean space that are allowed to cross each other.

In all of these cases the toroidal nature of a polyhedron can be verified by its orientability and by its Euler characteristic being non-positive. The Euler characteristic generalizes to V − E + F = 2 − 2g, where g is its topological genus.

== Császár and Szilassi polyhedra ==
Two of the simplest possible embedded toroidal polyhedra are the Császár and Szilassi polyhedra.

The Császár polyhedron is a seven-vertex toroidal polyhedron with 21 edges and 14 triangular faces. It and the tetrahedron are the only known polyhedra in which every possible line segment connecting two vertices forms an edge of the polyhedron. Its dual, the Szilassi polyhedron, has seven hexagonal faces that are all adjacent to each other, hence providing the existence half of the theorem that the maximum number of colors needed for a map on a (genus one) torus is seven.

The Császár polyhedron has the fewest possible vertices of any embedded toroidal polyhedron, and the Szilassi polyhedron has the fewest possible faces of any embedded toroidal polyhedron.

== Conway's toroidal deltahedron ==
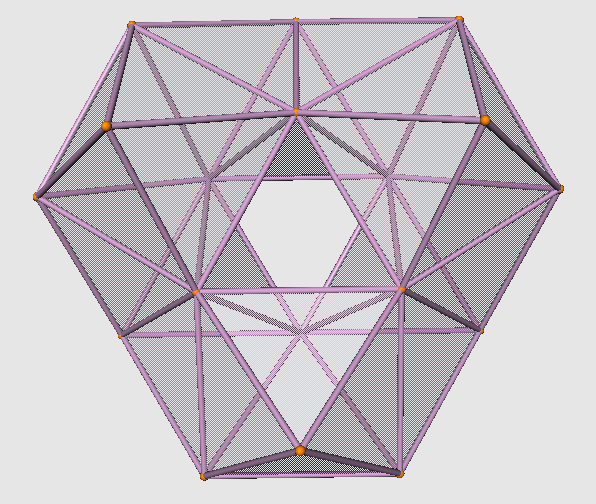
Conway's toroidal deltahedron

A toroidal deltahedron was described by John H. Conway in 1997, containing 18 vertices and 36 faces. Some adjacent faces are coplanar. Conway suggested that it should be the deltahedral toroid with the fewest possible faces.

== Stewart toroids ==
A special category of toroidal polyhedra are constructed exclusively by regular polygon faces, without crossings, and with a further restriction that adjacent faces may not lie in the same plane as each other. These are called Stewart toroids, named after Bonnie Stewart, who studied them intensively. They are analogous to the Johnson solids in the case of convex polyhedra; however, unlike the Johnson solids, there are infinitely many Stewart toroids. They include also toroidal deltahedra, polyhedra whose faces are all equilateral triangles.

A restricted class of Stewart toroids, also defined by Stewart, are the quasi-convex toroidal polyhedra. These are Stewart toroids that include all of the edges of their convex hulls. For such a polyhedron, each face of the convex hull either lies on the surface of the toroid, or is a polygon all of whose edges lie on the surface of the toroid.

Stewart toroids by augmentation of a single polyhedron
| Genus | 1 | 1 |
|---|---|---|
| Image | | |
| Polyhedra | 6 hexagonal prisms | 8 octahedra |
| Vertices | 48 | 24 |
| Edges | 84 | 72 |
| Faces | 36 | 48 |

Quasi-convex Stewart toroids
| Genus | 1 | | 3 | 11 | 3 | 5 | 7 | 11 |
|---|---|---|---|---|---|---|---|---|
| Image | | | | | | | | |
| Polyhedra | 4 square cupolae 8 tetrahedra | 6 triangular cupolae 6 square pyramids | 4 triangular cupolae 6 square pyramids | 24 triangular prisms 6 square pyramids 8 tetrahedra | 6 square cupolae 4 triangular cupolae 12 cubes | 8 triangular cupolae 12 cubes | 6 square cupolae 12 cubes | 6 square cupolae 8 triangular cupolae |
| Convex hull | truncated cube | truncated octahedron | truncated octahedron | expanded cuboctahedron | truncated cuboctahedron | truncated cuboctahedron | truncated cuboctahedron | truncated cuboctahedron |
| Vertices | 32 | 30 | 30 | 62 | 72 | 72 | 72 | 72 |
| Edges | 64 | 60 | 72 | 168 | 144 | 168 | 168 | 168 |
| Faces | 32 | 30 | 38 | 86 | 68 | 88 | 84 | 76 |

== Self-crossing polyhedra ==
| Octahemioctahedron | Small cubicuboctahedron | Great dodecahedron |

A polyhedron that is formed by a system of crossing polygons corresponds to an abstract topological manifold formed by its polygons and their system of shared edges and vertices, and the genus of the polyhedron may be determined from this abstract manifold. Examples include the genus-1 octahemioctahedron, the genus-3 small cubicuboctahedron, and the genus-4 great dodecahedron.

=== Crown polyhedra ===
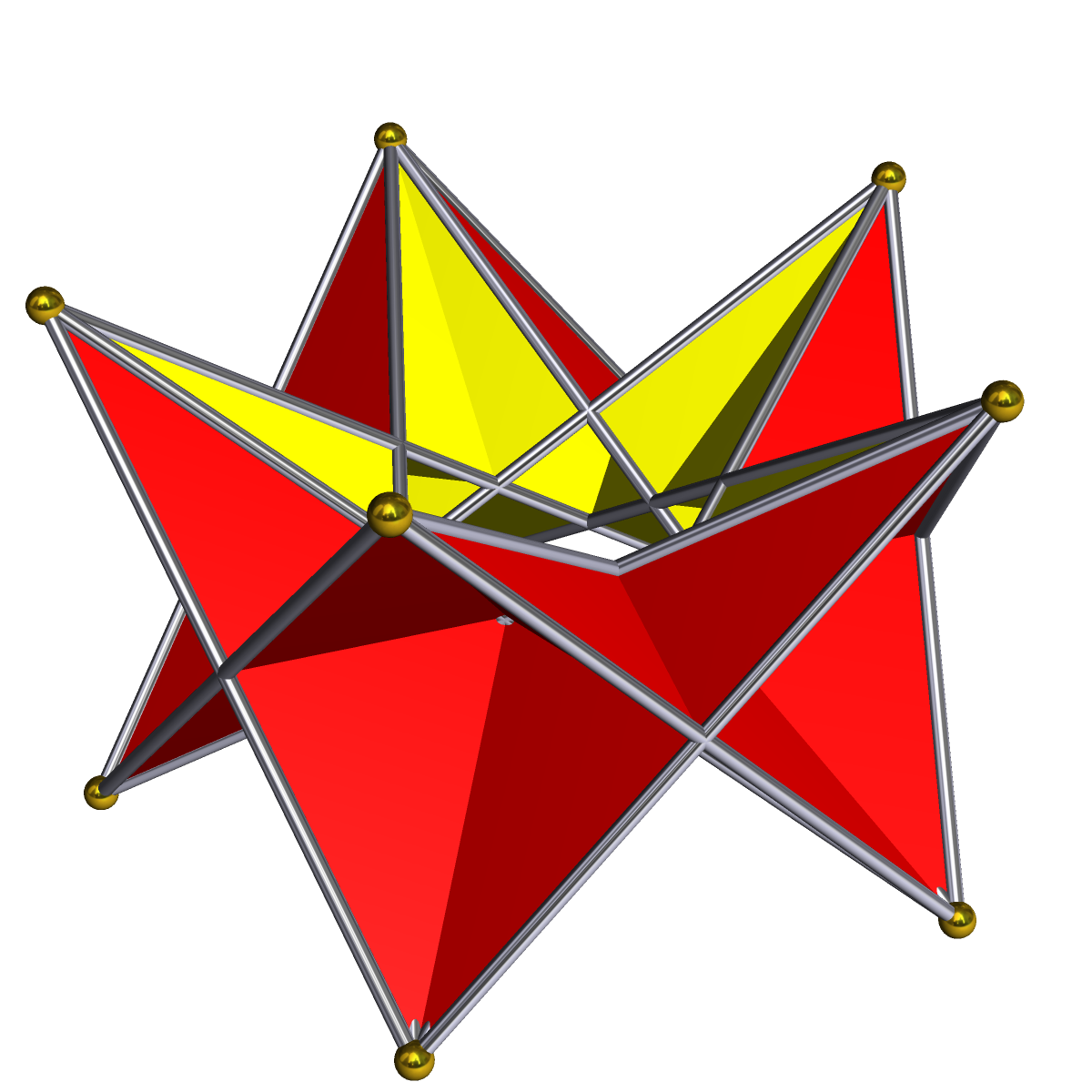
Pentagonal stephanoid. This stephanoid has pentagonal dihedral symmetry and has the same vertices as the uniform pentagonal prism.

A crown polyhedron or stephanoid is a toroidal polyhedron which is also noble, being both isogonal (equal vertices) and isohedral (equal faces). Crown polyhedra are self-intersecting and topologically self-dual. Their faces are antiparallelograms.

== See also ==
- Projective polyhedron
- Skew apeirohedron (infinite skew polyhedron)
- Spherical polyhedron
- Toroidal graph
