= Lindblad =

Lindblad is a surname of Swedish origin which may refer to:

== People ==
- Adolf Fredrik Lindblad, (1801–1878), Swedish composer
- Alessandro Lindblad (Alesso) (born 1991), Swedish DJ and producer
- Amanda Lindblad (born 1991), Swedish politician
- Arvid Lindblad (born 2007), British racing driver
- Bertil Lindblad (1895–1965), Swedish astronomer
- Göran Lindblad (physicist), (1940–2022), Swedish theoretical physicist
- Göran Lindblad (politician), (born 1950), Swedish politician, Member of Parliament
- Hanna Lindblad (born 1980), Swedish singer
- Henry Lindblad (1906–1946), Swedish athlete
- Jan Lindblad (1932–1987), Swedish naturalist, writer, photographer
- Kerstin Lindblad-Toh, Swedish scientist
- Lars Lindblad, (born 1971), Swedish politician
- Lars-Eric Lindblad (1927–1994), Swedish-American entrepreneur and explorer
- Otto Lindblad, (1809–1864) Swedish composer of Kungssången, the Swedish royal anthem
- Paul Lindblad (1941–2000), American baseball player
- Rune Lindblad (1923–1991), Swedish composer of musique concrète

== Sciences ==
- Lindblad equation, in quantum mechanics, the most general type of Markov master equation
- Lindblad resonance, in astronomy, a type of orbital resonance in galactic disks and planetary rings

== Location ==
- Lindblad (crater), an old lunar crater on the far side of the Moon, just beyond the northwestern limb.

== Ship ==
- MS Lindblad Explorer, Liberian-registered cruise ship designed for Arctic and Antarctic service, originally commissioned and operated by the Swedish explorer Lars-Eric Lindblad
