= Poncelet (disambiguation) =

The Poncelet is a unit of power formerly used in France.

Poncelet may also refer to:

- French submarine Poncelet (Q141), a Vichy French submarine sunk off the coast of Gabon during the World War II Battle of Gabon
- Poncelet (crater), the remains of a lunar impact crater near the northern limb of the Moon
- Christian Poncelet (1928–2020), French politician
- Jean-Victor Poncelet (1788–1867), French engineer and mathematician
- Matthew Poncelet, the character played by Sean Penn in the 1995 film Dead Man Walking, based on real-life death-row inmate Elmo Patrick Sonnier

== See also ==
- Poncelet Prize, a mathematics prize by the French Academy of Sciences
- Poncelet's closure theorem, mathematics
- Poncelet–Steiner theorem, mathematics and geometry.
