= Brianchon =

Brianchon may refer to:

- Charles Julien Brianchon, French mathematician
- Maurice Brianchon, (1899–1979), French artist
- Brianchon, a lunar crater
