= Brianchon (crater) =

Lunar impact crater

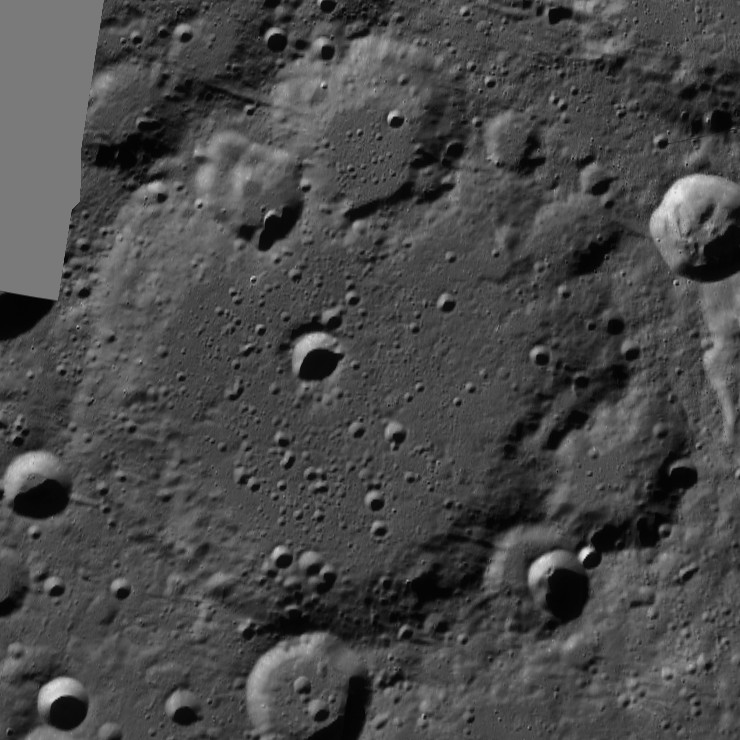
- LRO mosaic
- Coordinates: 74.8°N 86.5°W
- Diameter: 137.26 km (85.29 mi)
- Depth: Unknown
- Colongitude: 95° at sunrise
- Formation: Pre-Nectarian
- Eponym: Charles J. Brianchon

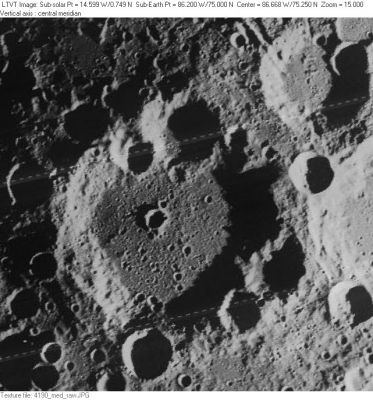
Lunar Orbiter 4 image

Brianchon is a lunar impact crater that is located along the northwestern limb of the Moon. Due to its location, from the Earth the crater is seen from the edge and its visibility is somewhat affected by libration. Thus for a more detailed view, the crater must be viewed from orbit.

This crater lies just to the west of the crater Pascal, and Desargues is to the southeast. To the south of Brianchon along the limb is the crater Cremona, while Lindblad lies to the southwest just on the far side of the Moon.

This formation dates to the Pre-Nectarian period of the lunar geologic timescale. Brianchon has been worn and eroded by a history of impacts that followed its creation. The most prominent of these are a pair of craters that lie across the northern rim, and Brianchon B which intrudes slightly into the southern rim. Brianchon A forms an outward bulge in the rim to the northwest, but otherwise merges seamlessly into the crater formation. There is also a concentric crater formation intruding into the exterion of the southeastern rim. The remainder of the outer wall has been rounded, and is covered in a number of tiny craterlets.

The floor of the crater is relatively level, and is pockmarked by a multitude of tiny craterlets. The most prominent of these is a small, bowl-shaped crater just to the northwest of the midpoint. The southern portion of the crater floor in particular contains a grouping of several tiny craterlets.

This crater is named after French mathematician Charles J. Brianchon (1783–1864). His name was introduced into lunar nomenclature by David W. G. Arthur and Ewen Whitaker with the Rectified Lunar Atlas (1963). It was officially adopted by the International Astronomical Union in 1964.

== Satellite craters ==
These features are identified on lunar maps by placing the letter on the side of the crater midpoint that is closest to Brianchon.

| Brianchon | Latitude | Longitude | Diameter |
|---|---|---|---|
| A | 76.7° N | 86.3° W | 50 km |
| B | 72.2° N | 89.1° W | 31 km |
| T | 75.8° N | 99.8° W | 30 km |
