= Anaximenes =

Anaximenes (Ancient Greek: Ἀναξιμένης) may refer to:

- Anaximenes of Lampsacus (4th century BC), Greek rhetorician and historian
- Anaximenes of Miletus (6th century BC), Greek pre-Socratic philosopher
- Anaximenes (crater), a lunar crater
