= NGC 1253 =

Spiral galaxy in the constellation Eridanus

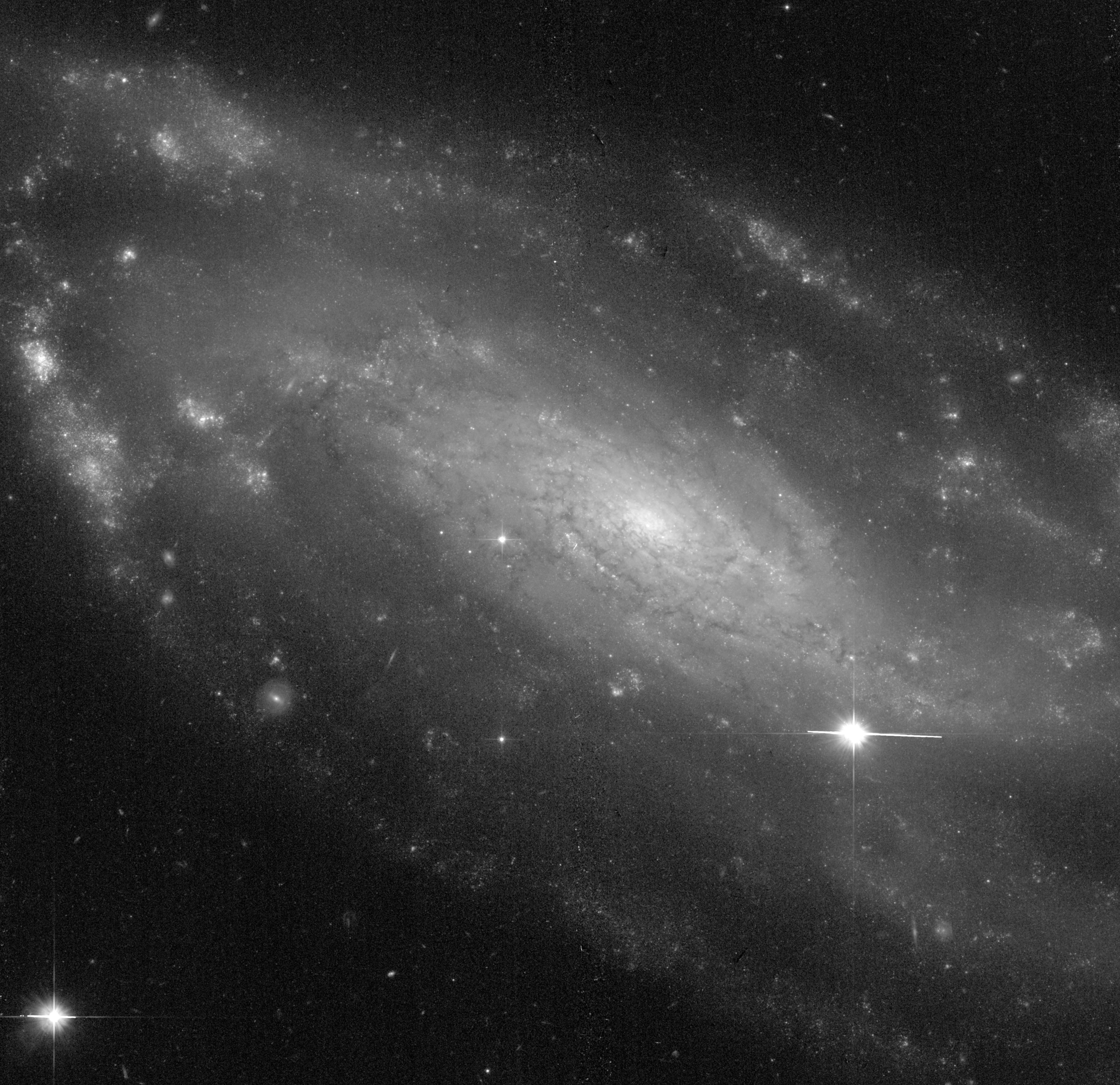
- NGC 1253 by Hubble Space Telescope

Observation data (J2000 epoch)
- Constellation: Eridanus
- Right ascension: 03^{h} 14^{m} 09.1^{s}
- Declination: −02° 49′ 23″
- Redshift: 0.005713 ± 0.000002
- Heliocentric radial velocity: 1,713 ± 1 km/s
- Distance: 69 ± 15.8 Mly (21.2 ± 4.85 Mpc)
- Apparent magnitude (V): 11.7

Characteristics
- Type: SAB(rs)cd
- Apparent size (V): 5.2′ × 2.3′
- Notable features: Interacting galaxy

Other designations
- UGCA 62, Arp 279, MCG -01-09-018, IRAS 03116-0300, PGC 12041

NGC 1253 is a spiral galaxy in the constellation Eridanus. The galaxy lies about 70 million light years away from Earth, which means, given its apparent dimensions, that NGC 1253 is approximately 110,000 light years across. It was discovered by William Herschel on September 20, 1784.

NGC 1253 is categorised as having a having a bar, however its spiral arms are similar to that of Whirlpool Galaxy. The galaxy has two spiral arms, probably as a result of interaction with its satellite. The spiral arms end in what looks like a ring of hydrogen gas, while the inner area of the galaxy appears to be hydrogen poor. The velocity pattern indicates that the ring lies at the outer Lindblad resonance. The highest hydrogen density is observed at the northwest part of the ring. The largest HII regions of the galaxy lie along that ring. The supermassive black hole located in the centre of the galaxy is estimated to have a mass of 10^{6.99 ± 0.53} (3 − 33 millions) M_{☉}.

NGC 1253 forms an interacting pair with NGC 1253A, a Magellanic spiral galaxy which lies 3.7 arcminutes away, which corresponds to a projected distance of 25 kiloparsecs. The two galaxies share a common hydrogen envelope. The hydrogen envelope has an extension at its eastern side to the north that could be a tidal tail. The two galaxies belong in the same galaxy cloud as Messier 77 and its group.

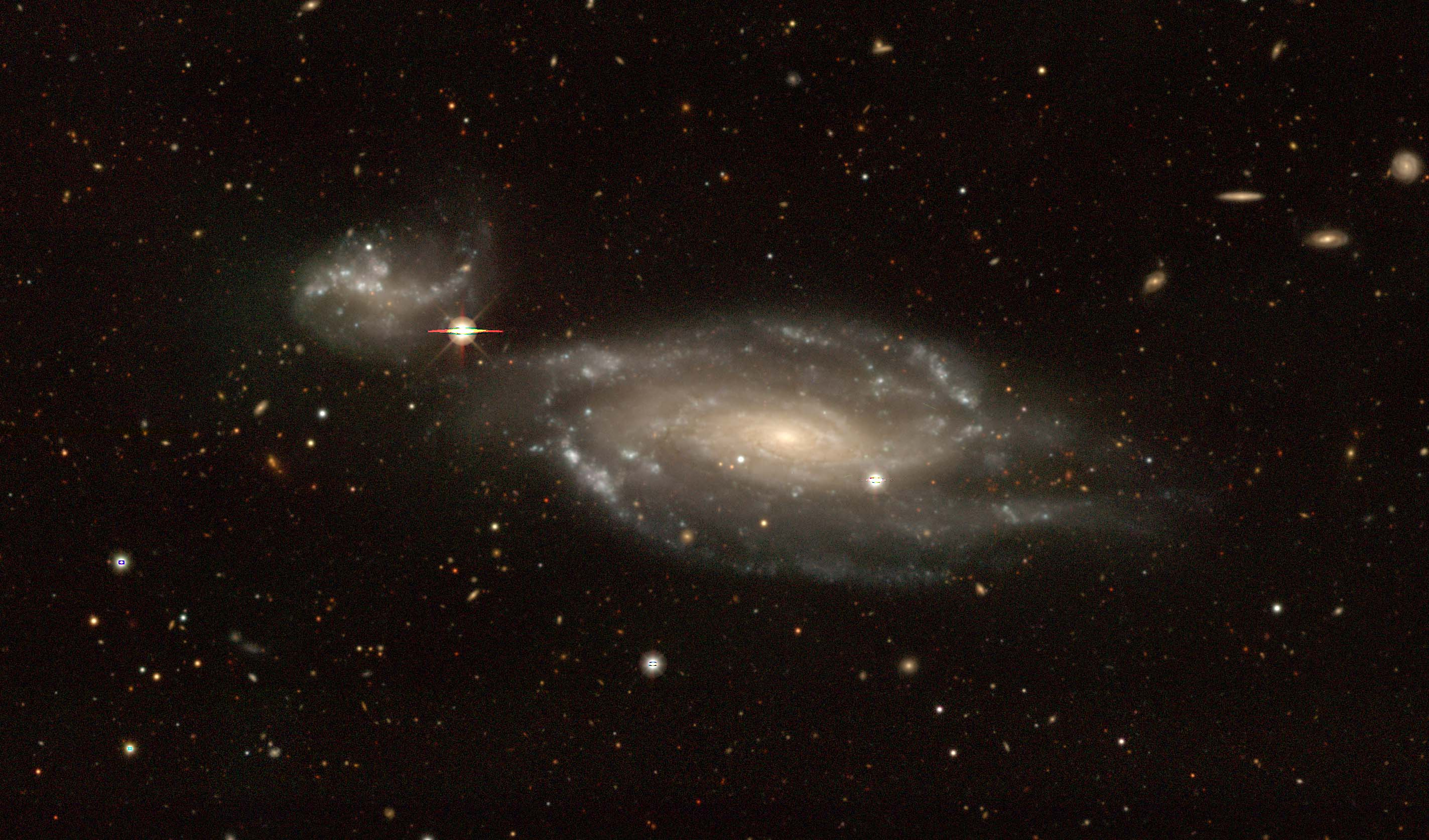
PGC 12053 & NGC 1253
