= Poncelet (crater) =

Crater on the Moon

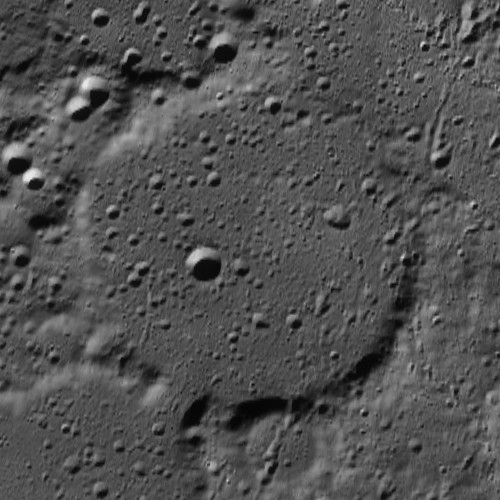
- LRO mosaic
- Coordinates: 75.8°N 54.1°W
- Diameter: 69 km
- Depth: Unknown
- Colongitude: 57° at sunrise
- Eponym: Jean V. Poncelet

Poncelet is the remains of a lunar impact crater that is located near the northern limb of the Moon. It lies to the east-northeast of the crater Pascal and northwest of Anaximenes. Like the latter formation, Poncelet is a worn, eroded formation with an interior that has been flooded, either with lava or possibly ejecta. The outer rim is a low, circular ridge with a narrow break to the south and a wider breach to the northeast. The interior floor is pock-marked with many tiny craterlets, the most notable of which is Poncelet H, located just to the southeast of the midpoint.

This crater is named after French mathematician and engineer Jean V. Poncelet (1788–1867).

== Satellite craters ==
By convention these features are identified on lunar maps by placing the letter on the side of the crater midpoint that is closest to Poncelet.

Poncelet	Latitude	Longitude	Diameter
A	79.5° N	74.7° W	31 km
B	78.6° N	62.3° W	32 km
C	77.4° N	73.7° W	67 km
D	77.7° N	70.0° W	23 km
H	75.7° N	55.2° W	7 km
P	80.6° N	61.1° W	15 km
Q	79.9° N	59.9° W	14 km
R	79.3° N	57.3° W	10 km
S	78.7° N	56.2° W	10 km
