= Annales de Gergonne =

French mathematical journal (1810-31)

Annales de Mathématiques Pures et Appliquées
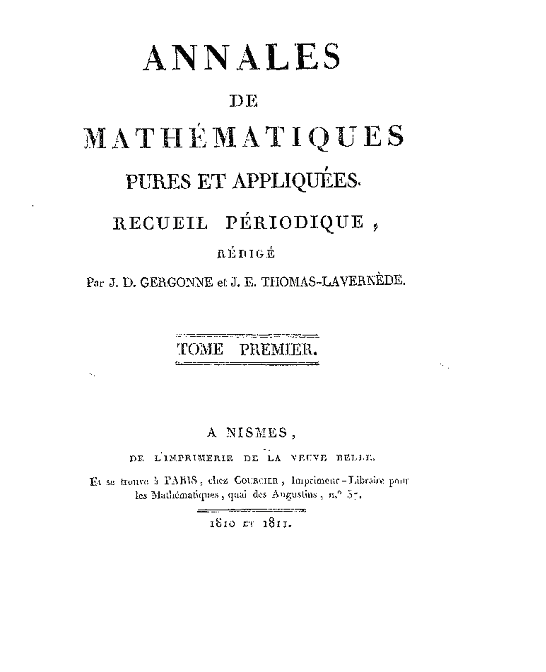
- Discipline: Mathematics
- Language: French
- Edited by: Joseph Gergonne

Publication details
- History: 1810–1831
- Frequency: Monthly

Standard abbreviations
- ISO 4: Ann. Math. Pures Appl.

Links
- Journal homepage

The Annales de Mathématiques Pures et Appliquées (French pronunciation: [anal də matematik pyʁ e aplike], lit. 'Annals of Pure and Applied Mathematics'), commonly known as the Annales de Gergonne ([anal də ʒɛʁɡɔn], Annals of Gergonne), was a mathematical journal published in Nîmes, France from 1810 to 1831 by Joseph Diez Gergonne. The annals were largely devoted to geometry, with additional articles on history, philosophy, and mathematics education showing interdisciplinarity.

"In the Annales, Gergonne established in form and content a set of exceptionally high standards for mathematical journalism. New symbols and new terms to enrich mathematical literature are found here for the first time. The journal, which met with instant approval, became a model for many another editor. Cauchy, Poncelet, Brianchon, Steiner, Plücker, Crelle, Poisson, Ampere, Chasles, and Liouville sent articles for publication."

Operational calculus was developed in the journal in 1814 by Francois-Joseph Servois.

The reference to both pure mathematics and applied mathematics in the journal title inspired replications in later journals:

- Journal de Mathématiques Pures et Appliquées started in 1836 by Joseph Liouville
- Journal für die reine und angewandte Mathematik, commonly known as Crelle's Journal
- The Quarterly Journal of Pure and Applied Mathematics, title adopted by Cambridge in 1855
- Annali di Matematica Pura ed Applicata, the first Italian periodical, title adopted in 1858
- Communications on Pure and Applied Mathematics, adopted 1959 at Courant Institute
- Journal of Pure and Applied Algebra from 1971
