= Aina Elvius =

Swedish astronomer (1917–2019)

- Born: Aina Margareta Eriksson; 26 June 1917; Stockholm, Sweden
- Died: 23 May 2019 (aged 101)
- Occupation: Astronomer
- Organizations: International Astronomical Union; Royal Swedish Academy of Sciences

Aina Margareta Elvius (26 June 1917 – 23 May 2019) was a Swedish astronomer known for her work on polarized light from galaxies and the nuclei of active galaxies. She was professor of astronomy at Stockholm University, director of the Stockholm Observatory, and the second Swedish woman to be elected to the Royal Swedish Academy of Sciences.

== Biography ==
Aina Elvius was born on 26 June 1917 in Södermalm, Stockholm. She attended the girls' school Högre allmänna läroverket för flickor in Norrmalm, also in Stockholm, gaining her school leaving certificate in 1937. This is the same year she began studying at Stockholms högskola (college); in 1945, she finished her master's degree in mathematics, physics, chemistry and astronomy. She spent a year working as a teacher at Saltsjöbaden coeducational school in 1946-47.

In 1948, she began her polarimetric studies of galaxies at Stockholm University using Öhman's Polarography and in 1951 she published her first polarization study of the spiral galaxy M63. She was later invited by John Scotville Hall to work at the Lowell Observatory, where she made a series of observations of the polarization of light from galaxies and from nebulae in the Milky Way. She defended her doctoral thesis at Stockholm University College in 1956. In the same year, she became an associate professor of astronomy at Stockholm University. In 1960, she received a doctoral degree at Uppsala University and then a post at the Swedish Science Research Council. From 1979 to 1981, she worked as a professor at the Department of Astronomy, which makes her the first female astronomy professor in Sweden.

== Affiliations ==
Elvius became a member of the Royal Swedish Academy of Sciences in 1975. She was the second woman to be elected to the academy, and the first one since 1748.

Elvius was a member of the International Astronomical Union. She held four different membership positions:

- Member of Division VI Interstellar Matter (until 2012)
- Member of Division VIII Galaxies & the Universe (until 2012)
- Member of Commissions 28 Galaxies (until 2015)
- Member of Commissions 34 Interstellar Matter (until 2015)

== Works ==
=== Articles ===
Elvius's first publications were articles she co-authored with John S. Hall and published in the Lowell Observer, a quarterly newsletter of Lowell Observatory. The first was an article published in 1964 titled "Polarimetric observations of NGC 5128 (Cent A) and other extragalactic objects." It was followed two years later in 1966 by "Observations of the color and polarization of the reflection nebulae NGC 2068, NCG 7023 and the Merope Nebula obtained in three spectral regions." Their next article was "Observations of polarization and color in the nebulosity associated with the Pleiades cluster," which was published on 8 September 1967.

Elvius co-authored an article with Hannes Alfvén that was published in Science Magazine. The article, "Antimatter, Quasi-stellar Objects, and the Evolution of Galaxies," was published on 23 May 1969.

In January 1972, Elvius published an article in the Proceedings of the International Astronomical Union called "A Matter-Antimatter Model for Quasi-Stellar Objects." The following year, in January 1973, she published another article with the journal titled, "Polarization of Light by Dust in Galaxies." Another year later, in January 1974, she and two other authors published the article "The Low Density Symmetric Cosmology" with the same journal.

=== Books ===
Elvius was the editor of From Plasma to Planet: Proceedings (Nobel Symposium). The collection was published by John Wiley & Sons Inc in 1972. Topics covered include plasma, interstellar matter, and solar systems.
