= Pascal (crater) =

Lunar impact crater

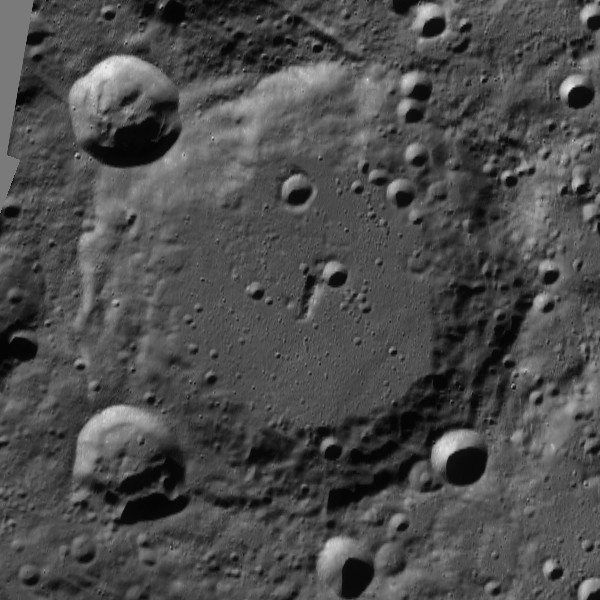
- LRO mosaic
- Coordinates: 74.6°N 70.3°W
- Diameter: 115 km
- Depth: 3.5 km
- Colongitude: 77° at sunrise
- Eponym: Blaise Pascal

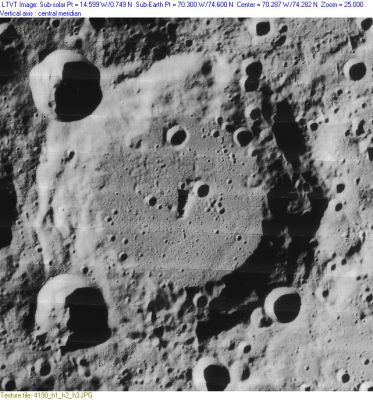
Lunar Orbiter 4 image

Pascal is a lunar impact crater that lies near the northern limb of the Moon, on the western side of the pole. It is located to the north of the eroded crater Desargues, and just east of Brianchon. Pascal can be located by finding the crater Carpenter and then following the surface to the northwest towards the limb. However the visibility of this formation can be affected by libration.

This crater has undergone a degree of impact erosion that has left its features softened and rounded. The rim can still be followed around the perimeter, but it is no longer sharp-edged and the interior terraces have been all but worn away. Several craters lie across the outer rim, including the sharp-edged Pascal F intruding into the northwest rim; a more worn Pascal A intruding into the southwest; and the small, bowl-shaped Pascal G along the southeast rim.

Within the wide inner walls is a nearly level interior floor that has been resurfaced by lava. At the midpoint is a low ridge, forming a minor central peak. There are tiny craters at the north end of the floor, and at the northeast end of the central ridge. There is also a small chain of craterlets lying across the northeast inner wall.

Just to the north of Pascal is Poncelet C, a satellite crater of the lava-flooded Poncelet to the east. The rim of this crater is bisected by several grooves in the surface, one of which crosses the southeast rim and cuts across tangentially to the northeastern rim of Pascal.

Formerly designated Carpenter D, this crater is named after French mathematician Blaise Pascal (1623–1662).

== Satellite craters ==
By convention these features are identified on lunar maps by placing the letter on the side of the crater midpoint that is closest to Pascal.

Pascal	Latitude	Longitude	Diameter
A	72.9° N	74.6° W	28 km
F	75.6° N	75.6° W	27 km
G	73.0° N	65.7° W	14 km
J	72.2° N	69.0° W	14 km
L	73.8° N	63.0° W	15 km
