= Stockholm Observatory =

Astronomical observatory

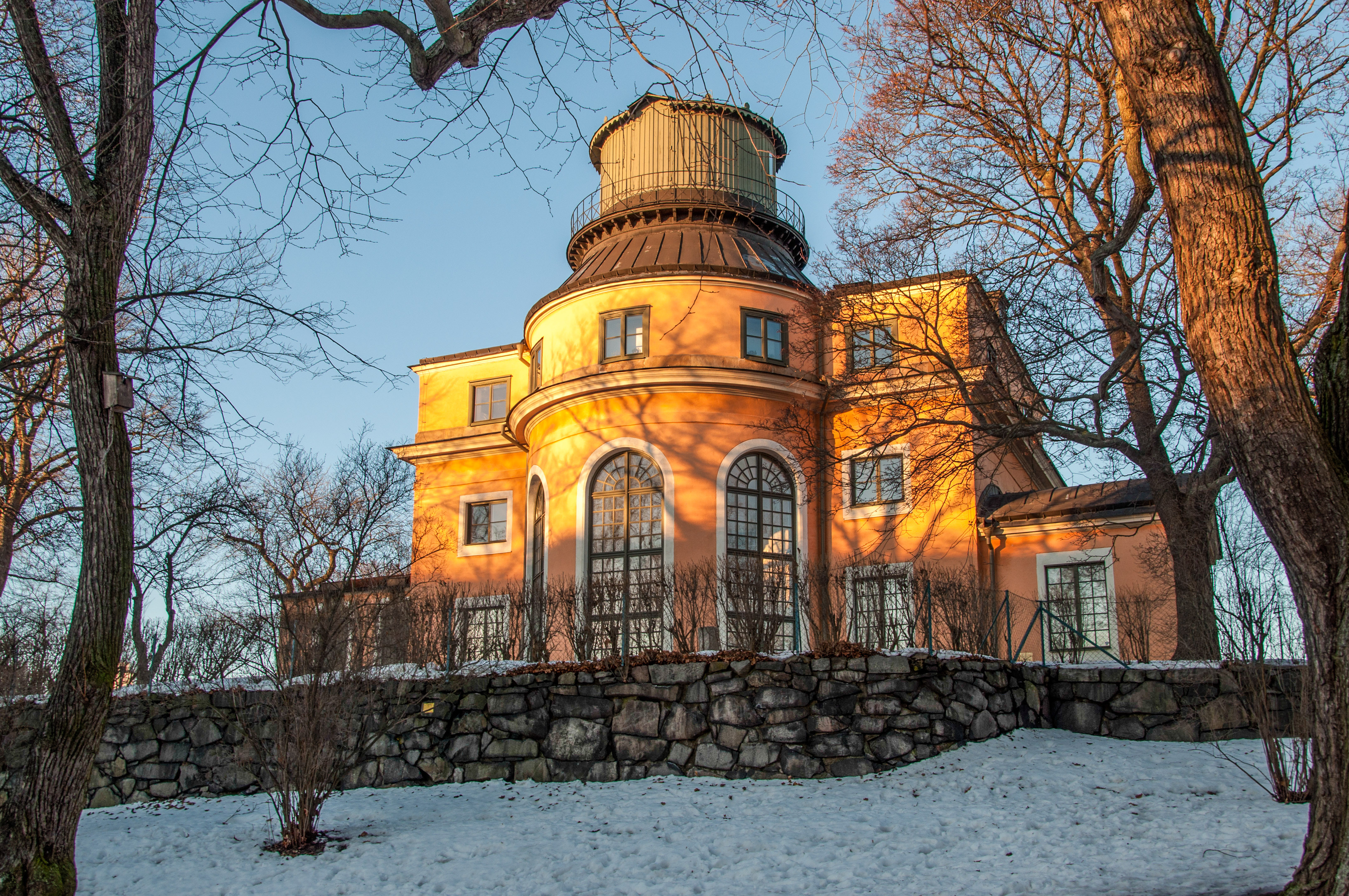
- The 18th-century Stockholm Observatory
- Observatory code: 050
- Location: Vasastan, Stockholm Municipality, Stockholm County, Sweden
- Coordinates: 59°20′30″N 18°03′17″E
- Commercial telescopes: building
- Location of Stockholm Observatory
- Related media on Commons

The Stockholm Observatory (Swedish: Stockholms observatorium, 050) is an astronomical observatory and institution in Stockholm, Sweden, founded in the 18th century and today part of Stockholm University. In 1931, the new Stockholm Observatory (Swedish: Saltsjöbaden Observatory, 052), nicknamed "Saltis", was inaugurated on the Karlsbaderberget at Saltsjöbaden, near Stockholm, and operated until 2001.

There are records of daily weather observations from the observatory going back to 1754.

The Stockholm Observatory site at Saltsjöbaden was established with a 40-inch (102 cm) reflecting telescope from Grubb, built in 1931. Also of historical interest is a double telescope by Grubb, the 24/20-inch refractor, with has one 24-inch aperture another 20-inch on the same mount established in 1931.

The old observatory is in modern times a museum (Observatory Museum); known for a good view of the city of Stockholm from the dome. It also has some sculptures and a walled garden. The old observatory has many items from across the centuries, including a Repsold telescope and a marble-inlaid meridian line. Many old observatory instruments involved determining the location of stars, the local time, and data was recorded manually. In the late 19th century, astrophotography became more common, and the Replsold refractor is known to have been used for making images, which had to be done with chemicals that reacted with light.

== History ==
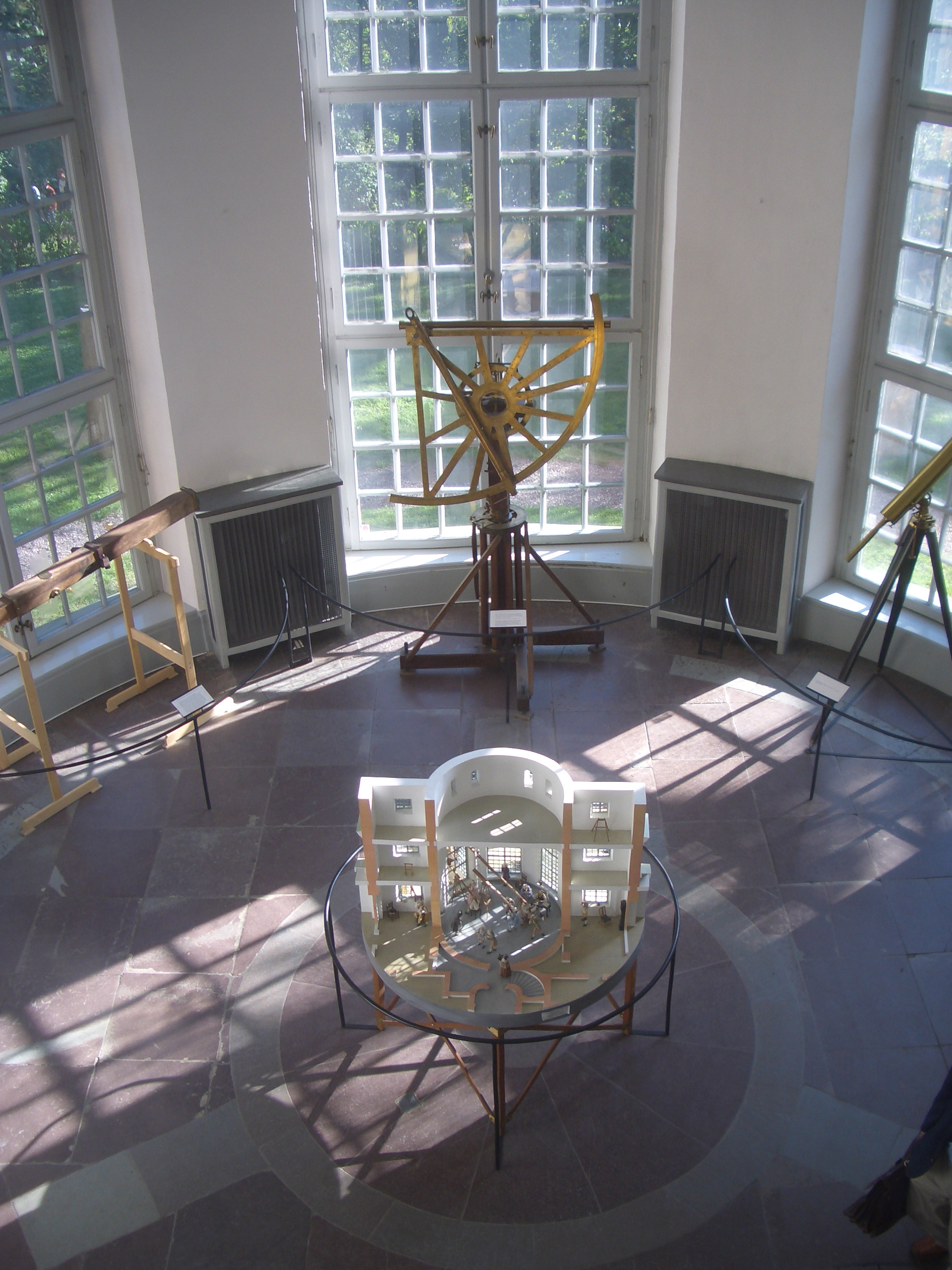
The old observation room used before the top dome was built in the 19th century.

The first observatory was established by the Royal Swedish Academy of Sciences on the initiative of its secretary Per Elvius. Construction, according to designs by the architect Carl Hårleman, begun in 1748 and the building was completed in 1753. It is situated on a hill in a park nowadays named Observatorielunden. The first head of the observatory was Pehr Wilhelm Wargentin. Later heads of the observatory include Hugo Gyldén and Bertil Lindblad. This 18th-century observatory today functions as a museum. 59°20′30″N 18°03′17″E

A newer observatory was built in Saltsjöbaden outside Stockholm and completed in 1931 (the architect this time being Axel Anderberg). 59.27167°N 18.30833°E More recent astronomical observations, however, are almost exclusively being done in observatories outside Sweden and closer to the equator.

The research institute was transferred from the academy to the university in 1973 and is since 2001 housed in the AlbaNova University Centre.

The young Hjalmar Branting, later the first social democratic prime minister of Sweden, was employed as a mathematics assistant at the Stockholm Observatory 1879–1880 and 1882–1883.

== Honors ==
In August 2000, the asteroid 36614 Saltis was discovered at the Stockholm Observatory. The asteroid was named after the nickname of the observatory's location, Saltsjöbaden, by its discoverer Alexis Brandeker in 2003.

4043 Perolof is named after a director of the Stockholm Observatory, Per Olof Lindblad.

== Stockholm Observatory at Saltsjöbaden ==
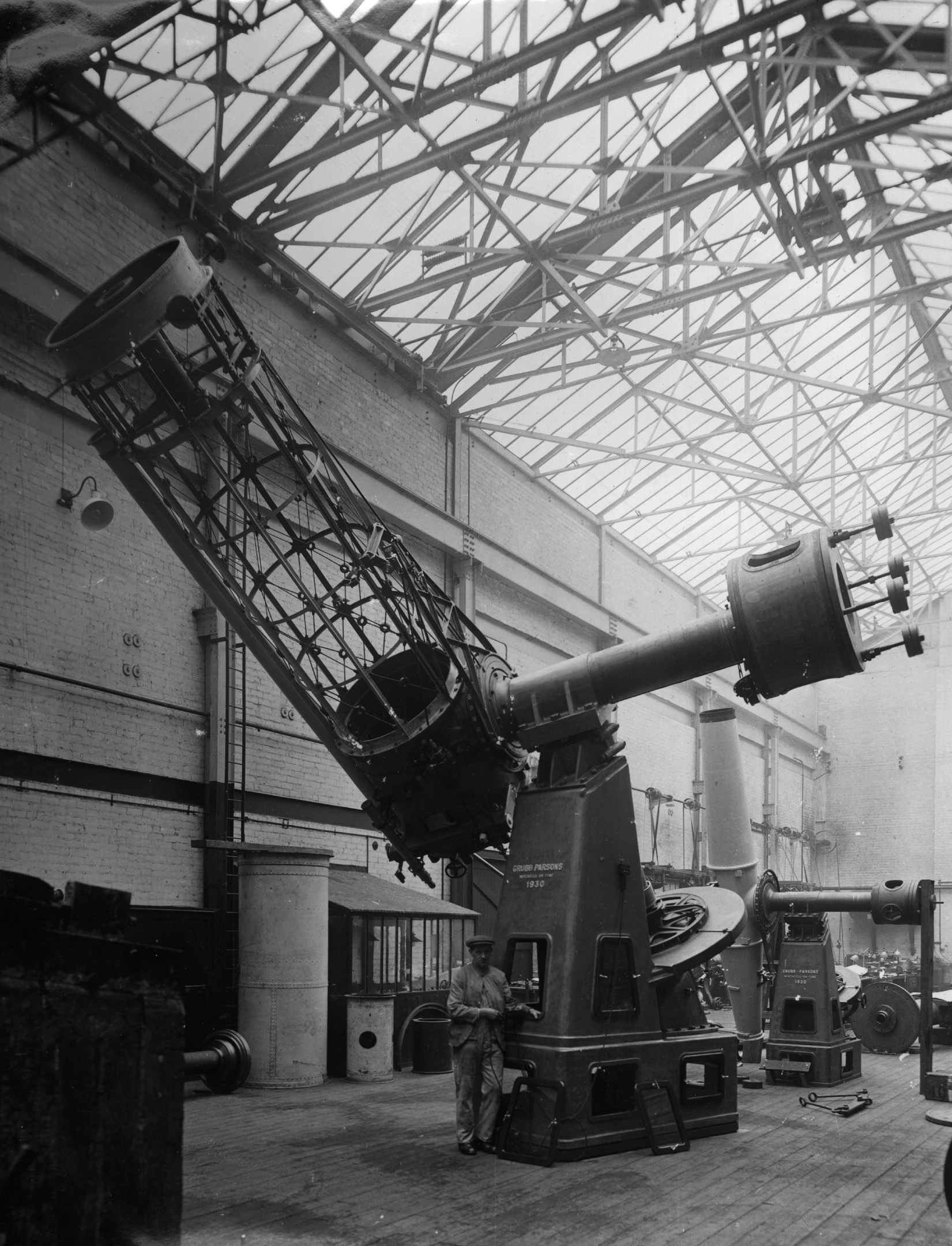
The Grubb 40 inch aperture reflector during its manufacture in the 1920s. Telescopes of about 1 meter were popular at this time in the 20th century.

It was common for really old observatories to be built on a new site in Europe; fortunately, the old observatory is not torn down, as happened in many cases. The old site was revitalized. One issue was the increased crowding in the cities, and astronomy was becoming more focused on data from space in the late 20th century. The 40-inch (102 cm) reflector was one of the largest telescopes in the world in 1931.

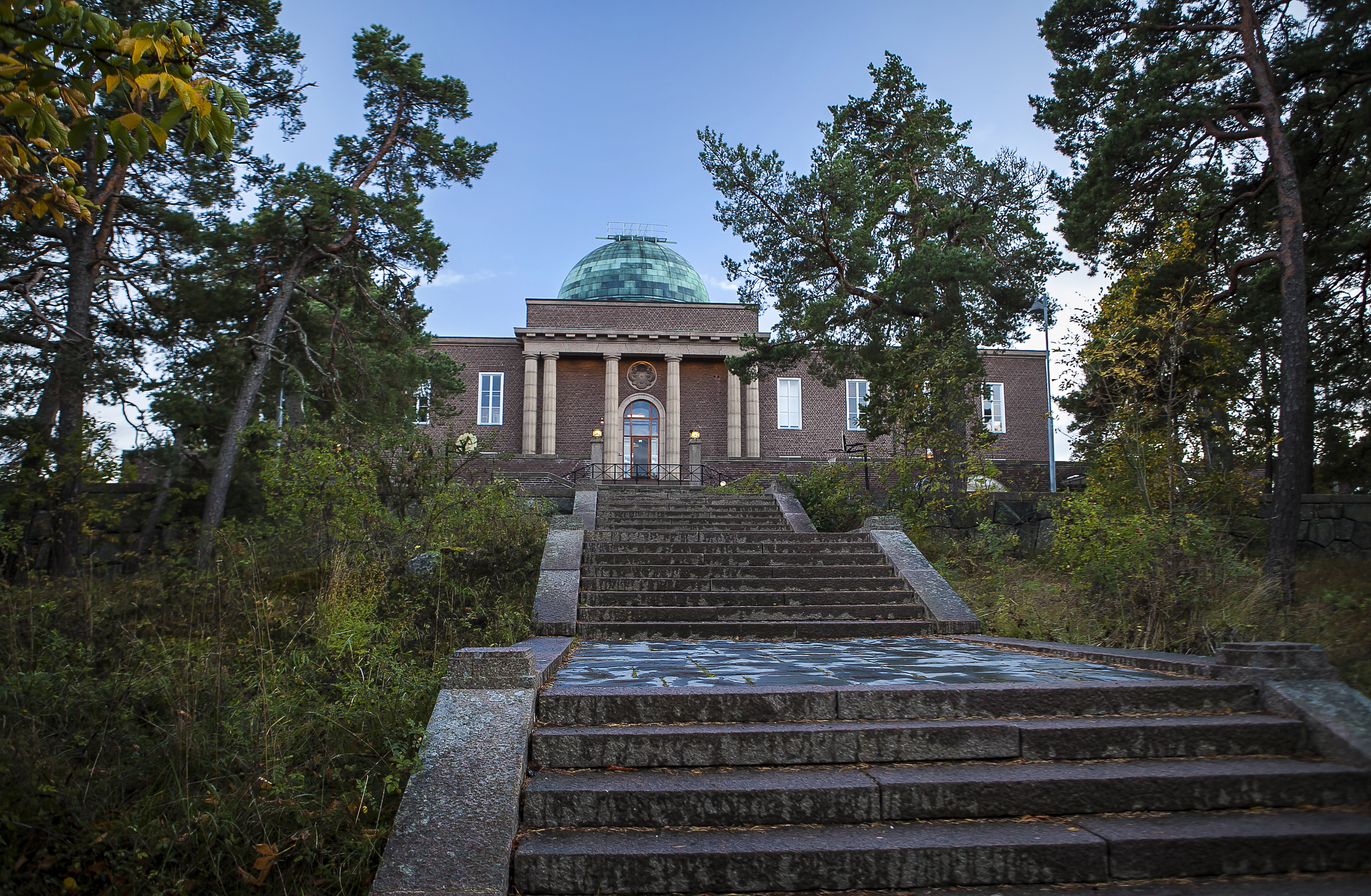
The new observatory at Saltsjöbaden

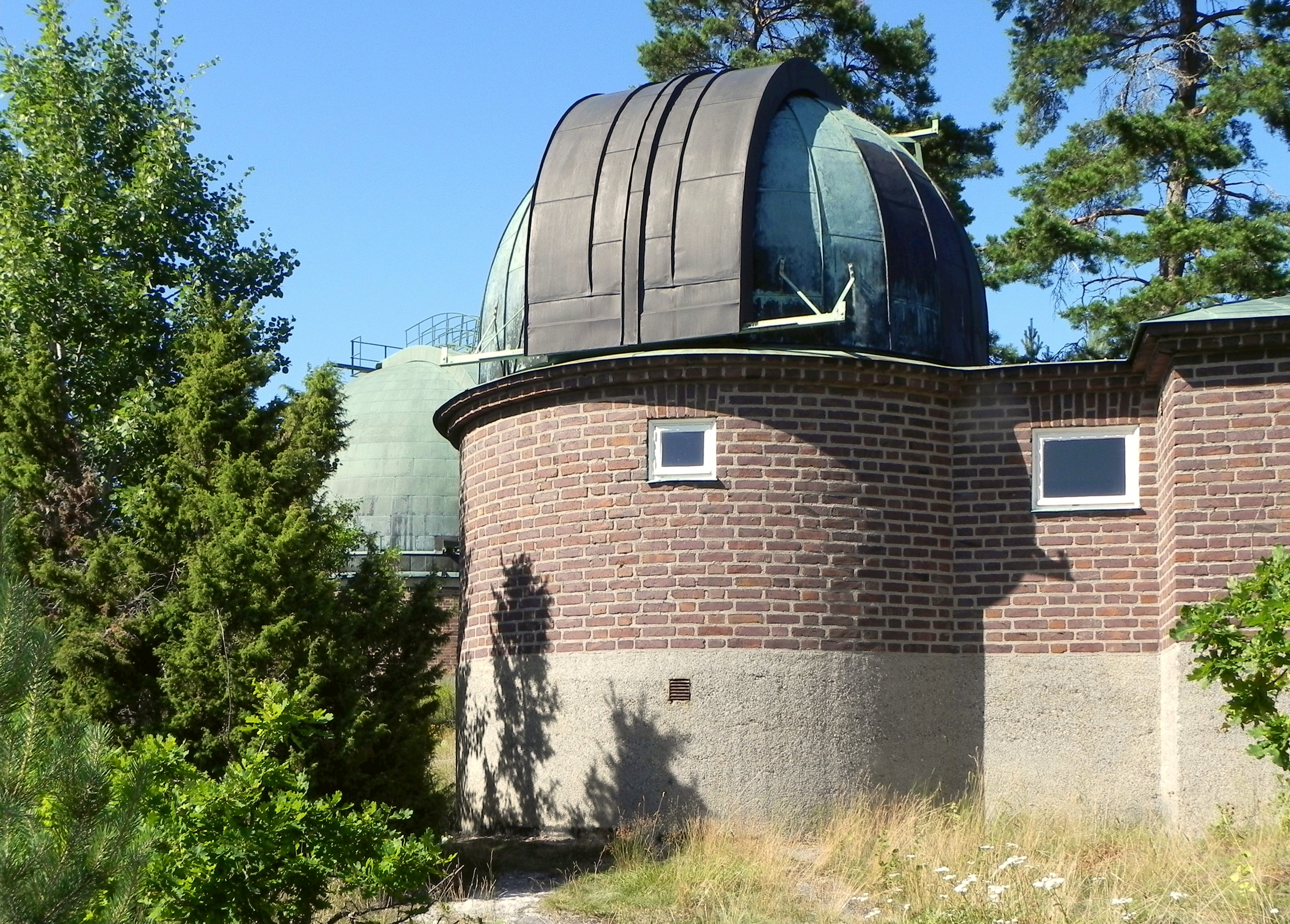
More of the Saltsjöbaden site

== Instruments ==
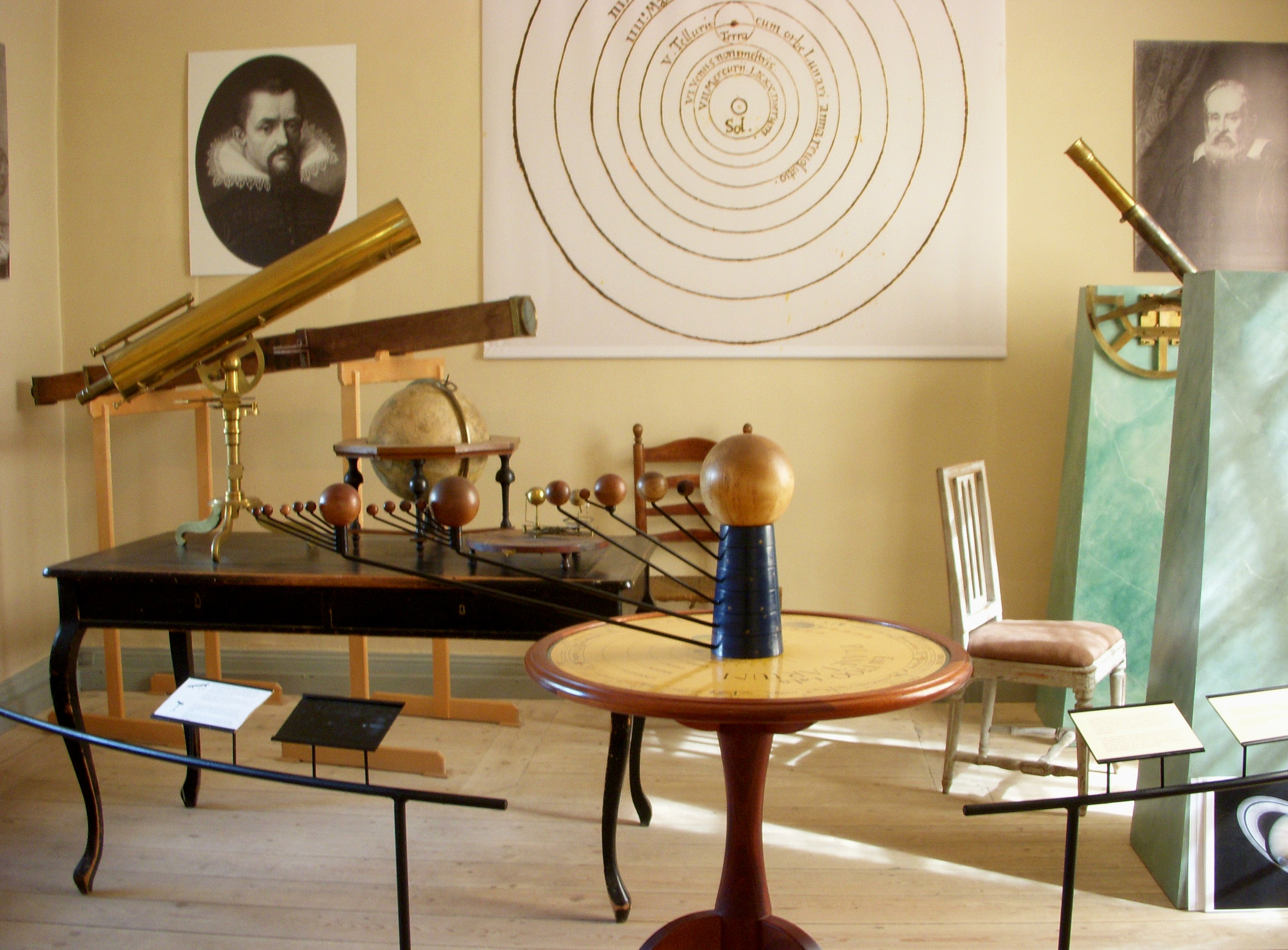
Old astronomical items at the observatory

Some first instruments for the observatory in the 1750s were two refractors and a small quadrant. Throughout the late 1700s, the collection was increased, including a refractor from Dollond and various clocks.

The clocks would be set by a device known as a transit instrument. Other activities at that time included trying determine distances in the Solar System, observing comets, and observations of the Mira (aka Omicron Ceti). The output of Mira was recorded for thirty years by the observatory.

Later instruments by the 19th century include a 7-inch Repsold refractor on an equatorial mount, which was noted to be used at the observatory for parallax observations of bright stars in 1884 edition of Encyclopædia Britannica.

Some of the new instruments at Saltsjöbaden:

- 40 inch (102 cm) reflecting telescope from Grubb, built in 1931.
- Grubb, the 24/20-inch refractor

== See also ==
- Architecture of Stockholm
- List of observatory codes
- Aina Elvius
- List of largest optical telescopes in the 20th century
- List of largest optical telescopes in the 19th century
- List of largest optical telescopes in the 18th century
