= Lycée Fabert =

Coordinates: 49°07′22″N 6°10′21″E

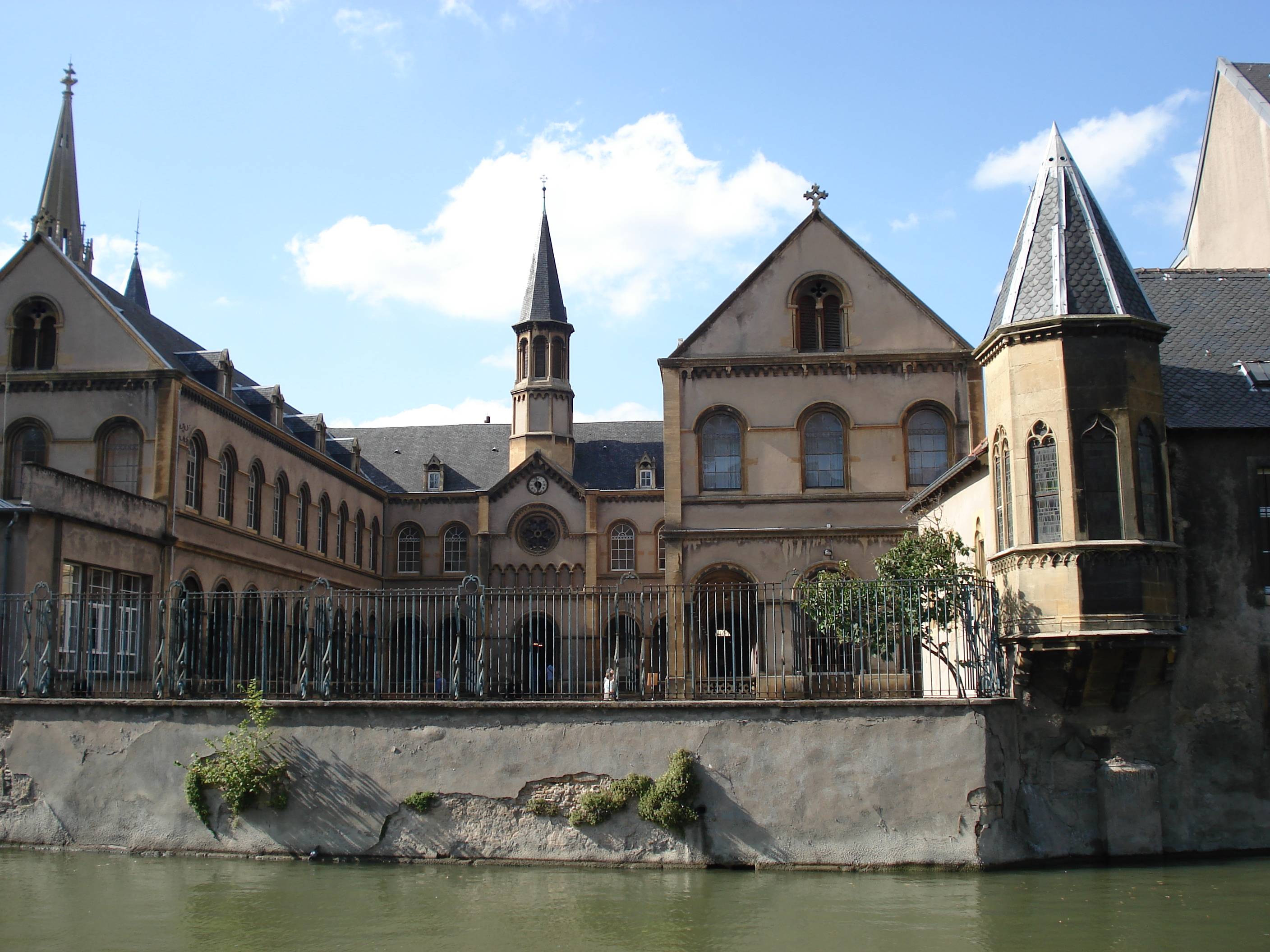
- Lycée Fabert
- Metz, Moselle, Lorraine; France

Lycée Fabert is a senior high school in Metz, Moselle department, Lorraine, France. The school, in the city centre, was the first lycée in Metz.

== Facility ==
The high school consists of several buildings. They include:

- The old lycée called "l'abbaye" - It is the former convent abbey of St. Vincent - It includes the headmaster offices, the staff offices, the library, and the cloister (cloître)
- The "petit lycée" (Small lycée) - Built in 1845
- The refectory - Built in 2003
- St. Constance Building
- Alexis de Tocqueville - It has served Classe préparatoire aux grandes écoles (CPGE) students since the northern hemisphere autumn of 1999
- Boarding dormitory ("L'internat")
- "Palais des sciences" - The science building
- Salle des Empereurs

== Notable alumni ==
- René Haby
- Sam Hocevar
- Louis Joxe
- Jean-Victor Poncelet
- Robert Schuman
- Alexis de Tocqueville
- Joachim von Ribbentrop
