= Desargues (crater) =

Crater on the Moon

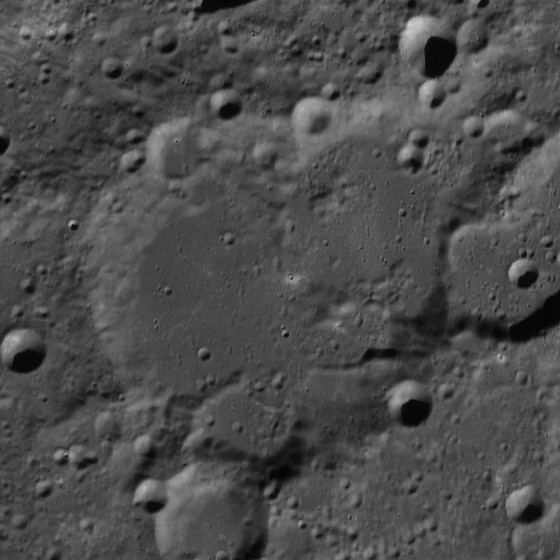
- LRO mosaic
- Coordinates: 70.2°N 73.3°W
- Diameter: 84.85 km (52.72 mi)
- Depth: Unknown
- Colongitude: 77° at sunrise
- Eponym: Gérard Desargues

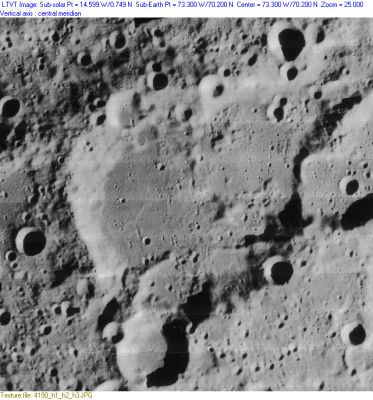
Lunar Orbiter 4 image

Desargues is an ancient lunar impact crater that is located near the northern limb of the Moon, on the western hemisphere. It lies nearly due south of the crater Pascal, and southeast of Brianchon. The proximity of this crater to the limb means that it appears highly elongated due to foreshortening, and it is difficult to discern details from the Earth.

This formation has been significantly eroded and degraded with the passage of time, leaving a low, irregular rim that has been reshaped by subsequent impacts. The rim has a notable bulge to the northeast, and a lesser bulge along the southern rim. The later remains as an imprint of a ghost crater in the surface that overlies the southern rim, and leaves a remnant of its northern rim in the crater floor.

The bulge to the northeast has left a remnant of its origin in the crater floor, as a series of low hills extending from the north and southeast. These enclose the northeastern third of the floor, and are suggestive of an overlapping crater formation. This crater is overlain in turn by a pair of craters that lie across the eastern rim.

The floor of the crater is level and has most likely been resurfaced by subsequent basaltic lava flows, or by fallback and ejecta deposits. This wiped away much of the original structure of the interior, leaving ridges and traces where once lay crater rims. Other lesser craters intrude into the rim, with Desargues M forming a bulge into the southern rim and Desargues A overlying the northern rim.

This crater is named after French mathematician and engineer Gérard Desargues (1593–1662). His name was introduced into lunar nomenclature by David W. G. Arthur and Ewen Whitaker with the Rectified Lunar Atlas (1963). Its designation was officially adopted by the International Astronomical Union in 1964.

== Satellite craters ==
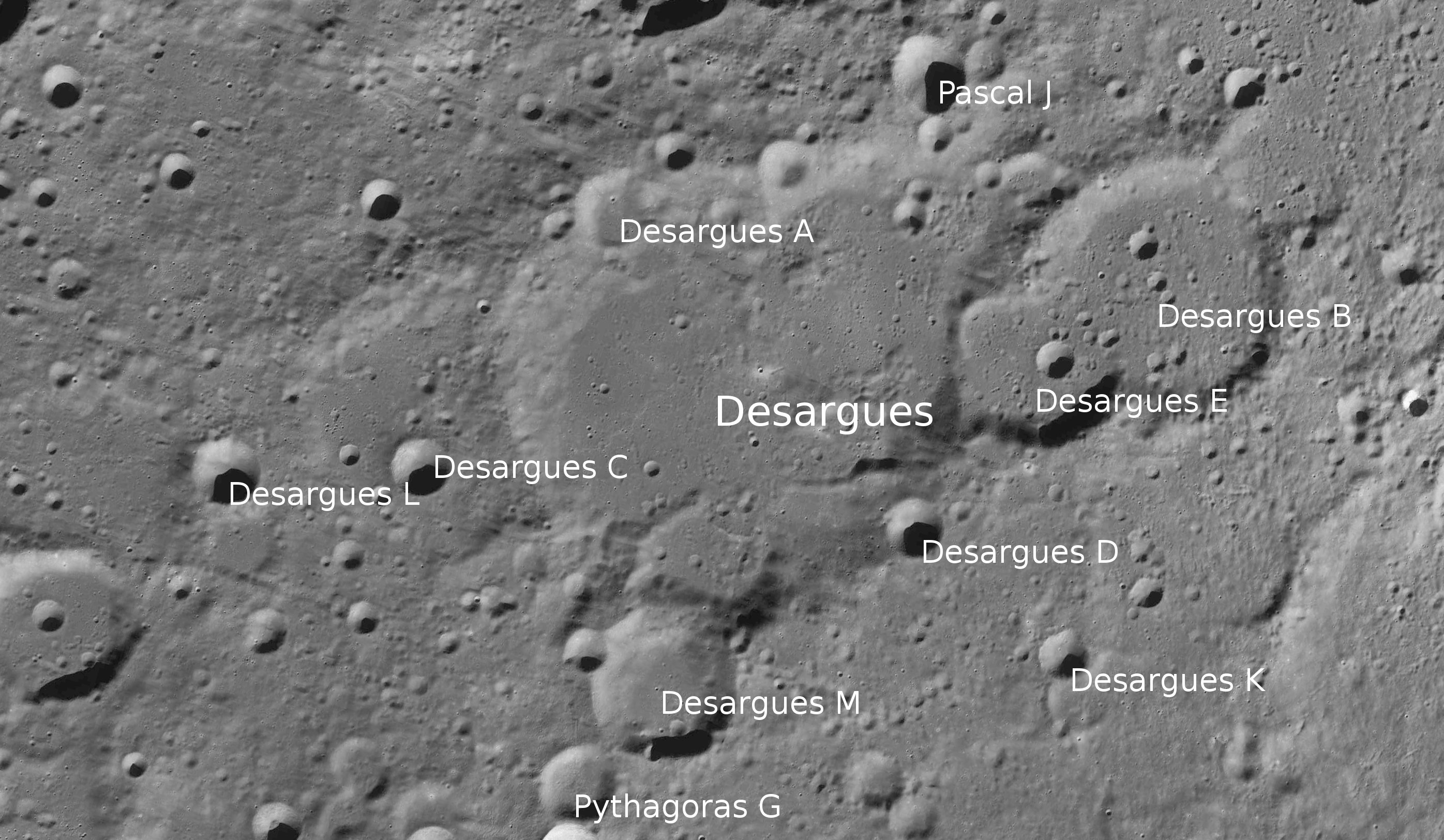
Satellite features of Desargues

By convention these features are identified on lunar maps by placing the letter on the side of the crater midpoint that is closest to Desargues.

Desargues	Latitude	Longitude	Diameter
A	71.4° N	75.3° W	30 km
B	70.7° N	65.0° W	50 km
C	69.7° N	78.4° W	12 km
D	69.3° N	69.6° W	11 km
E	70.2° N	67.4° W	31 km
K	68.5° N	67.2° W	10 km
L	69.6° N	82.2° W	13 km
M	68.4° N	73.9° W	30 km
