= Philolaus (crater) =

Crater on the Moon

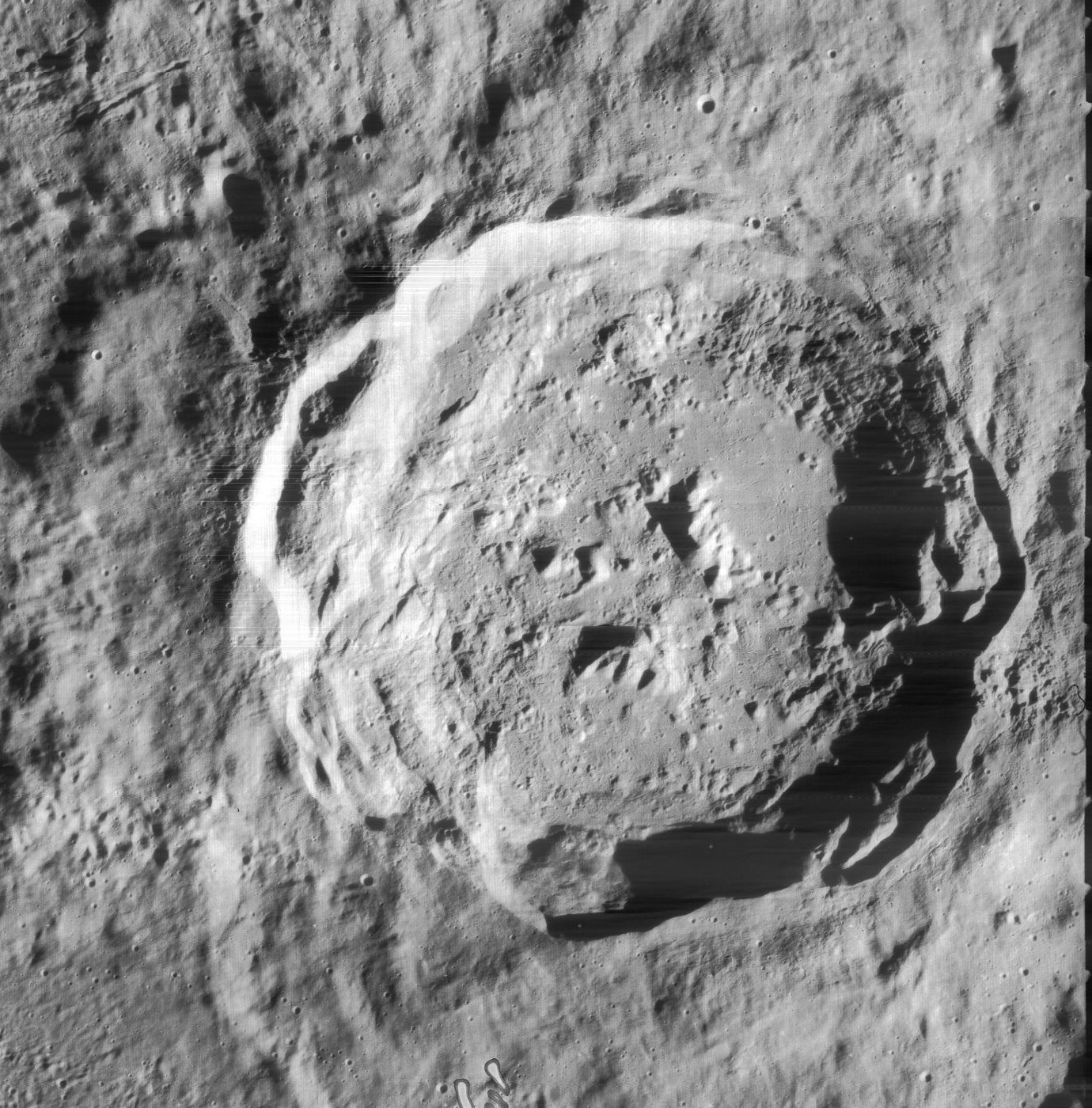
- Lunar Orbiter 4 image
- Coordinates: 72.1°N 32.4°W
- Diameter: 70 km
- Depth: 4.08 km (2.54 mi)
- Colongitude: 30° at sunrise
- Eponym: Philolaus

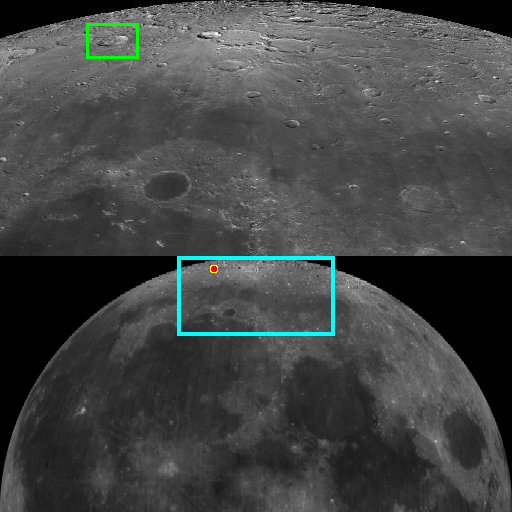
Location of Philolaus

Philolaus is a lunar impact crater that is located in the northern part of the Moon's near side. It lies within one crater diameter to the east-southeast of the flooded crater Anaximenes, and to the west of the smaller Anaxagoras. It overlies the older and heavily worn Philolaus C to the south.

This crater retains a well-defined form that has not changed significantly since it was originally created. The outer rim edge is roughly circular, but with a somewhat irregular edge that displays signs of slumping. The most notable slump is a triangular area along the eastern rim. The inner wall of the crater has a complex system of terraces with a sharp-edged rim in locations where slumping has occurred. On the exterior of the rim is an outer rampart that extends outwards for nearly half a crater diameter in all directions. The crater has a ray system, and is consequently mapped as part of the Copernican System.

The interior floor is irregular with rough areas about the center and to the northeast. There is no single central peak, but rather a pair of peaks offset to the south and the east of the middle. There is also a smaller ridge pair offset to the northwest. The flattest part of the interior floor is in the northeast of the crater interior. The floor is not significantly marked by impacts.

== Satellite craters ==
By convention these features are identified on lunar maps by placing the letter on the side of the crater midpoint that is closest to Philolaus.

Philolaus	Latitude	Longitude	Diameter
B	69.6° N	24.3° W	11 km
C	71.1° N	32.7° W	95 km
D	73.9° N	27.8° W	91 km
E	69.6° N	18.7° W	12 km
F	68.1° N	18.3° W	8 km
G	69.0° N	23.6° W	95 km
U	75.0° N	33.0° W	13 km
W	75.6° N	35.9° W	17 km
