= Anaximenes (crater) =

Lunar impact crater

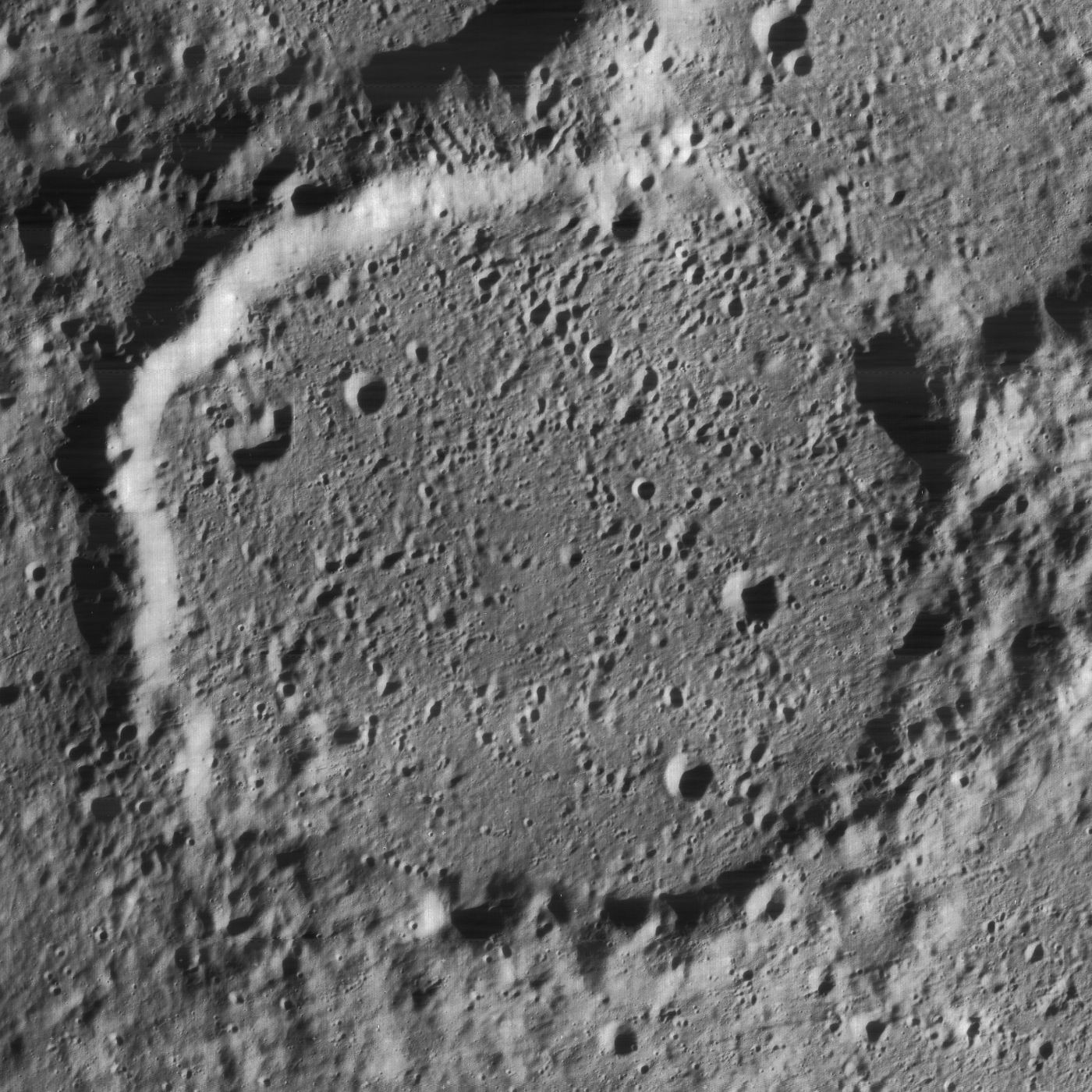
- Oblique Lunar Orbiter 4 image
- Coordinates: 72.49°N 44.98°W
- Diameter: 81.12 km (50.41 mi)
- Depth: 2.5 km (1.6 mi)
- Colongitude: 45° at sunrise
- Eponym: Anaximenes

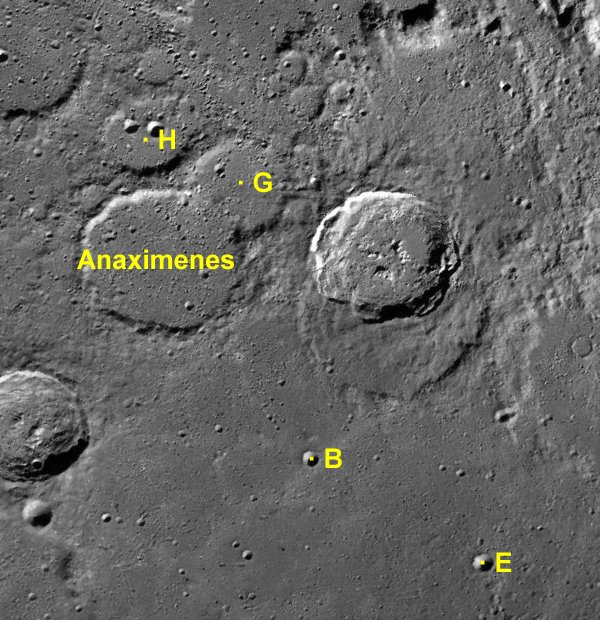
Satellite features

Anaximenes is a low-rimmed lunar impact crater near the north-northwest limb of the Moon. It lies to the west of the crater Philolaus, and northeast of Carpenter. To the northwest is Poncelet, close to the visible edge of the Moon.

The outer rim of Anaximenes has been eroded and worn into a roughly circular ring of ridges. The rim is lowest along the northeast side where Anaximenes partly overlaps the equally worn satellite crater Anaximenes G. There are also low cuts through the rim along the southeast, where the crater is attached to an unnamed plain in the surface.

The interior floor of Anaximenes is relatively level, compared to the typical lunar terrain. The inner surface is pock-marked by a multitude of tiny craterlets of various dimensions, the most notable having a diameter of 2-3 kilometers.

This crater is named after Greek astronomer Anaximenes of Miletus (585-528 B.C.). His name was introduced into lunar nomenclature in 1651 by Giovanni Ricciolli. Its designation was formally adopted by the International Astronomical Union in 1935.

== Satellite craters ==
By convention these features are identified on lunar maps by placing the letter on the side of the crater midpoint that is closest to Anaximenes.

Anaximenes	Latitude	Longitude	Diameter
B	68.8° N	37.9° W	9 km
E	66.5° N	31.4° W	10 km
G	73.8° N	40.4° W	56 km
H	74.6° N	45.3° W	43 km
