= Cremona (crater) =

Lunar impact crater

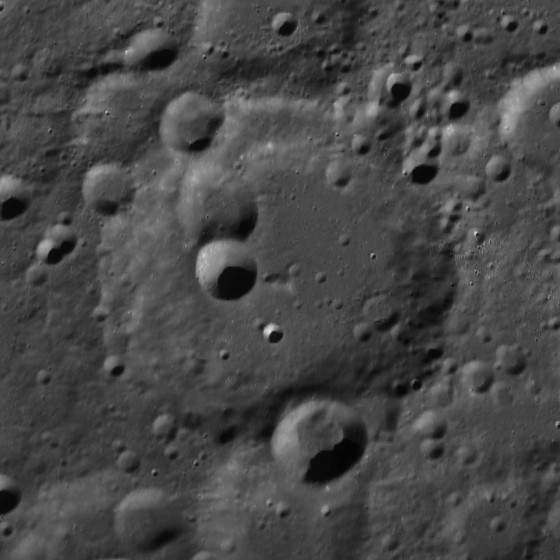
- LRO mosaic
- Coordinates: 67.5°N 90.6°W
- Diameter: 85.12 km (52.89 mi)
- Depth: Unknown
- Colongitude: 92° at sunrise
- Formation: Nectarian
- Eponym: Luigi Cremona

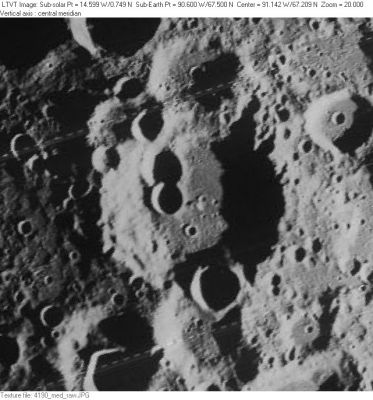
Lunar Orbiter 4 image

Cremona is a lunar impact crater that is located along the north-northwestern limb of the Moon. From the Earth this crater is viewed from the side, and the visibility is affected by libration effects. To be viewed in any detail, this crater must be seen or photographed from orbit. It is located midway between the crater Boole to the south-southeast and, on the far side of the Moon, the crater Lindblad.

This formation dates to the Nectarian period of the lunar geologic timescale. It is a relatively old, worn crater that is overlaid by a number of smaller craters. The rim has been worn down and rounded by lesser impacts, leaving only a wide depression in the surface with somewhat irregular interior walls. Small craters lie across the north and northwestern rims, and the satellite crater Cremona L is laid across the southern rim. A band of tiny craterlets lies across the northeastern part of the rim, continuing part of a pattern of multiple craterlets that continue to the north.

The craters Cremona B and C form a double-crater pair in the northwestern part of the floor. The inner wall on the western side is unusually wide, forming a rough interior surface. The floor in the eastern half is more level, and contains the remnant of a central peak attached to the eastern rim of Cremona C.

This crater is named after Italian mathematician and educator Luigi Cremona (1830–1903). His name was introduced into lunar nomenclature by David W. G. Arthur and Ewen Whitaker with the Rectified Lunar Atlas (1963). Its designation was officially adopted by the International Astronomical Union in 1964.

== Satellite craters ==
By convention these features are identified on lunar maps by placing the letter on the side of the crater midpoint that is closest to Cremona.

Cremona	Latitude	Longitude	Diameter
A	69.6° N	91.0° W	47 km
B	67.9° N	92.4° W	20 km
C	67.2° N	92.2° W	15 km
L	66.1° N	90.0° W	23 km
