= Jean-Victor Poncelet =

French engineer and mathematician (1788–1867)

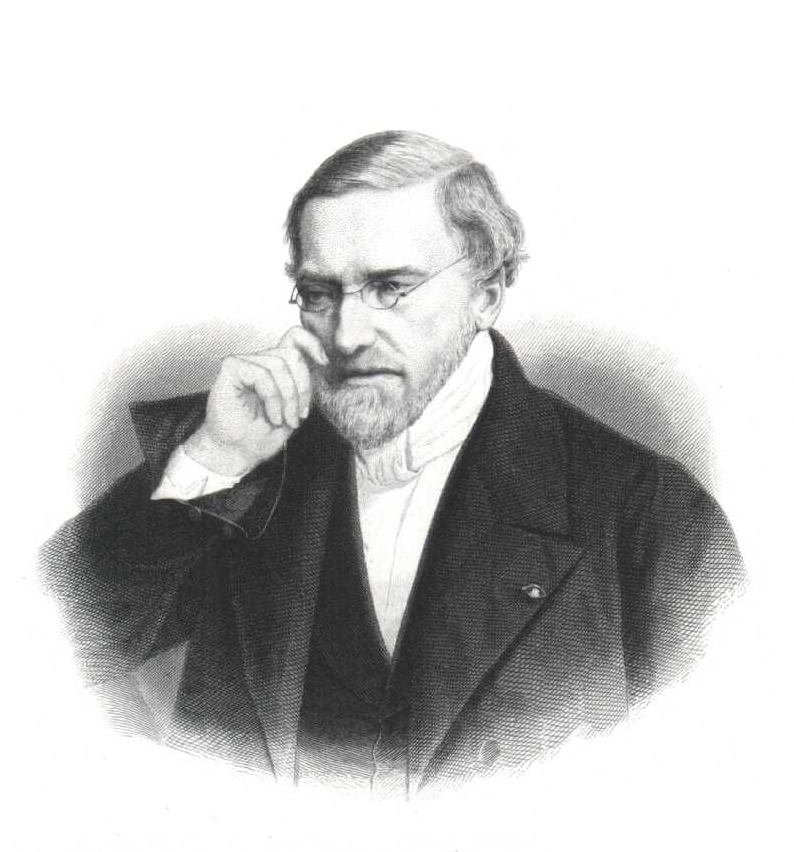
- Born: 1 July 1788; Metz, France
- Died: 22 December 1867 (aged 79); Paris, France
- Education: École Polytechnique
- Known for: Poncelet wheel Poncelet's porism Poncelet–Steiner theorem Trilinear polarity
- Awards: Pour le Mérite (1863); ForMemRS (1842)
- Scientific career
- Fields: Mathematics, engineering
- Workplaces: École d'application de l'artillerie of Metz; University of Paris; École Polytechnique
- Academic advisors: Gaspard Monge

Jean-Victor Poncelet (French pronunciation: [ʒɑ̃ viktɔʁ pɔ̃slɛ]; 1 July 1788 – 22 December 1867) was a French engineer and mathematician who served most notably as the Commanding General of the École Polytechnique. He is considered a reviver of projective geometry, and his work Traité des propriétés projectives des figures is considered the first definitive text on the subject since Gérard Desargues' work on it in the 17th century. He later wrote an introduction to it: Applications d'analyse et de géométrie.

As a mathematician, his most notable work was in projective geometry, although an early collaboration with Charles Julien Brianchon provided a significant contribution to Feuerbach's theorem. He also made discoveries about projective harmonic conjugates; relating these to the poles and polar lines associated with conic sections. He developed the concept of parallel lines meeting at a point at infinity and defined the circular points at infinity that are on every circle of the plane. These discoveries led to the principle of duality, and the principle of continuity and also aided in the development of complex numbers.

As a military engineer, he served in Napoleon's campaign against the Russian Empire in 1812, in which he was captured and held prisoner until 1814. Later, he served as a professor of mechanics at the École d'application in his home town of Metz, during which time he published Introduction à la mécanique industrielle, a work he is famous for, and improved the design of turbines and water wheels. While a professor of applied mechanics, he also, independently from Coriolis, pioneered the use of work in mechanics and the work-energy theorem, including coining the term "mechanical work". In 1837, a tenured 'Chaire de mécanique physique et expérimentale' was specially created for him at the Sorbonne (the University of Paris). In 1848, he became the commanding general of his alma mater, the École Polytechnique. He is honoured by having his name listed among notable French engineers and scientists displayed around the first stage of the Eiffel tower.

== Biography ==
=== Birth, education, and capture (1788–1814) ===
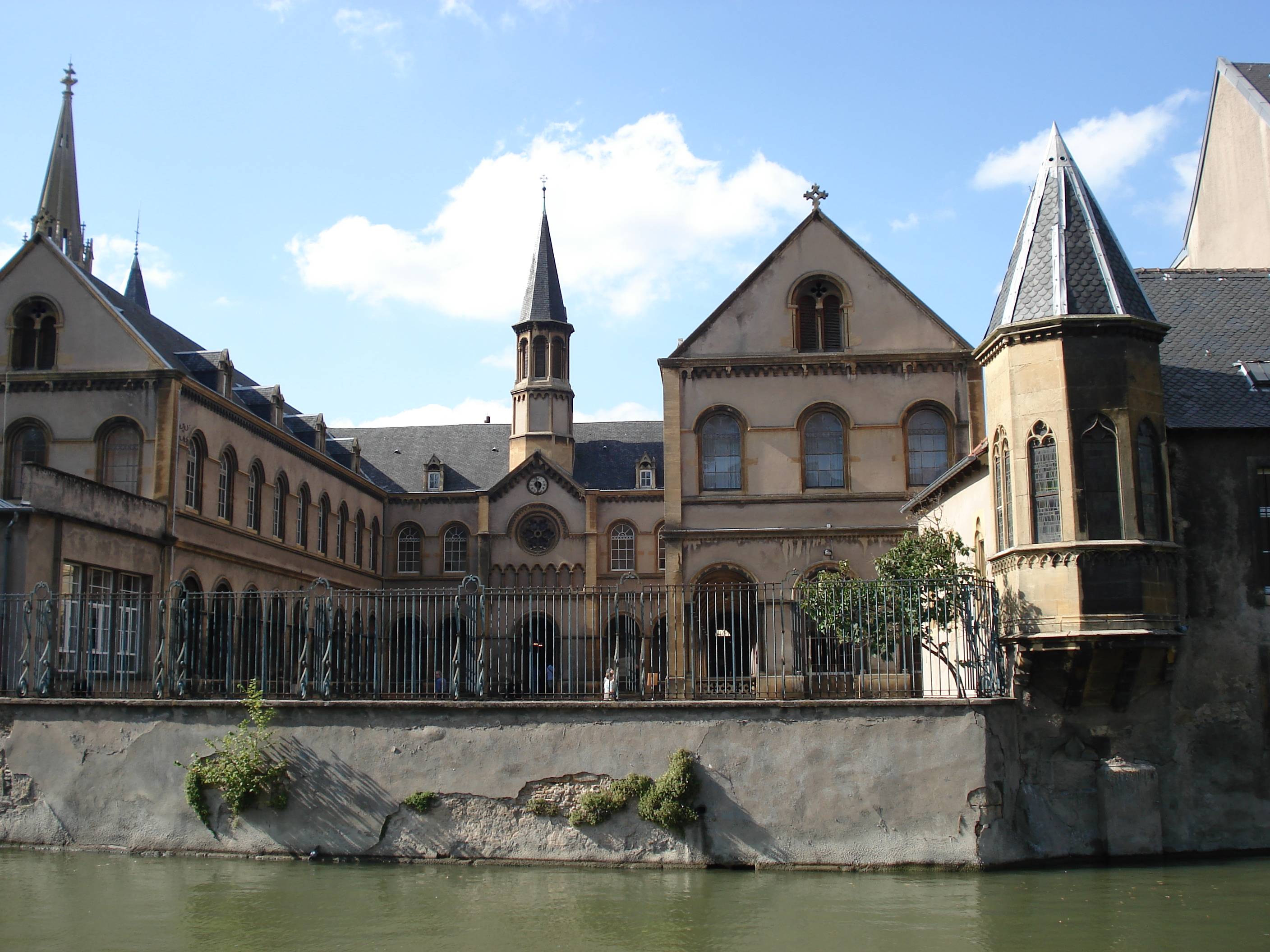
The Lycée Fabert in Metz, where Poncelet was fellow student.

Poncelet was born in Metz, France, on 1 July 1788, the illegitimate then legitimated son of Claude Poncelet, a lawyer of the Parliament of Metz and wealthy landowner. His mother, Anne-Marie Perrein, had a more modest background. At a young age, he was sent to live with the Olier family at Saint-Avold. He returned to Metz for his secondary education, at Lycée Fabert. After this, he attended the École Polytechnique, a prestigious school in Paris, from 1808 to 1810, though he fell behind in his studies in his third year due to poor health. After graduation, he joined the Corps of Military Engineers. He attended the École d'application in his hometown during this time, and achieved the rank of lieutenant in the French Army the same year he graduated.

Poncelet took part in Napoleon's invasion of Russia in 1812. His biographer Didion writes that he was part of the group which was cut from Marshal Michel Ney's army at the Battle of Krasnoi and was forced to capitulate to the Russians, though other sources say that he was left for dead. Upon capture, he was interrogated by General Mikhail Andreyevich Miloradovich, but he did not disclose any information. The Russians held him as a prisoner of war and confined him at Saratov. During his imprisonment, in the years 1813–1814, he wrote his most notable work, Traité des propriétés projectives des figures, which outlined the foundations of projective geometry, as well as some new results. Poncelet, however, could not publish it until after his release in 1814.

=== Release and later employment (1822–1848) ===
In 1815, the year after his release, Poncelet was employed a military engineer at his hometown of Metz. In 1822, while at this position, he published Traité des propriétés projectives des figures. This was the first major work to discuss projective geometry since Desargues', though Gaspard Monge had written a few minor works about it previously. It is considered the founding work of modern projective geometry. Joseph Diaz Gergonne also wrote about this branch of geometry at approximately the same time, beginning in 1810. Poncelet published several papers about the subject in Annales de Gergonne (officially known as Annales de mathématiques pures et appliquées). However, Poncelet and Gergonne ultimately engaged in a bitter priority dispute over the Principle of Duality.

In 1825, he became the professor of mechanics at the École d'Application in Metz, a position he held until 1835. During his tenure at this school, he improved the design of turbines and water wheels, deriving his work from the mechanics of the Provençal mill from southern France. Although the turbine of his design was not constructed until 1838, he envisioned such a design twelve years previous to that. In 1835, he left École d'Application, and in December 1837 became a tenured professor at Sorbonne (the University of Paris), where a 'Chaire de mécanique physique et expérimentale' was specially created for him with the support of Louis Jacques Thénard.

=== Commanding General at École Polytechnique (1848–1867) ===
In 1848, Poncelet became the Commanding General of his alma mater, the École Polytechnique. He held the position until 1850, when he retired.

During this time, he wrote Applications d'analyse et de géométrie, which served as an introduction to his earlier work Traité des propriétés projectives des figures. It was published in two volumes in 1862 and 1864. He was elected a Foreign Honorary Member of the American Academy of Arts and Sciences in 1865.

== Contributions ==
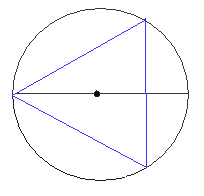
Steiner construction of an equilateral triangle

=== Poncelet–Steiner theorem ===
Poncelet discovered the following theorem in 1822: Euclidean compass and straightedge constructions can be carried out using only a straightedge if a single circle and its center is given. Swiss mathematician Jakob Steiner proved this theorem in 1833, leading to the name of the theorem. The constructions that this theorem states are possible are known as Steiner constructions.

=== Poncelet's porism ===
In geometry, Poncelet's porism (sometimes referred to as Poncelet's closure theorem) states that whenever a polygon is inscribed in one conic section and circumscribes another one, the polygon must be part of an infinite family of polygons that are all inscribed in and circumscribe the same two conics.

== List of selected works ==
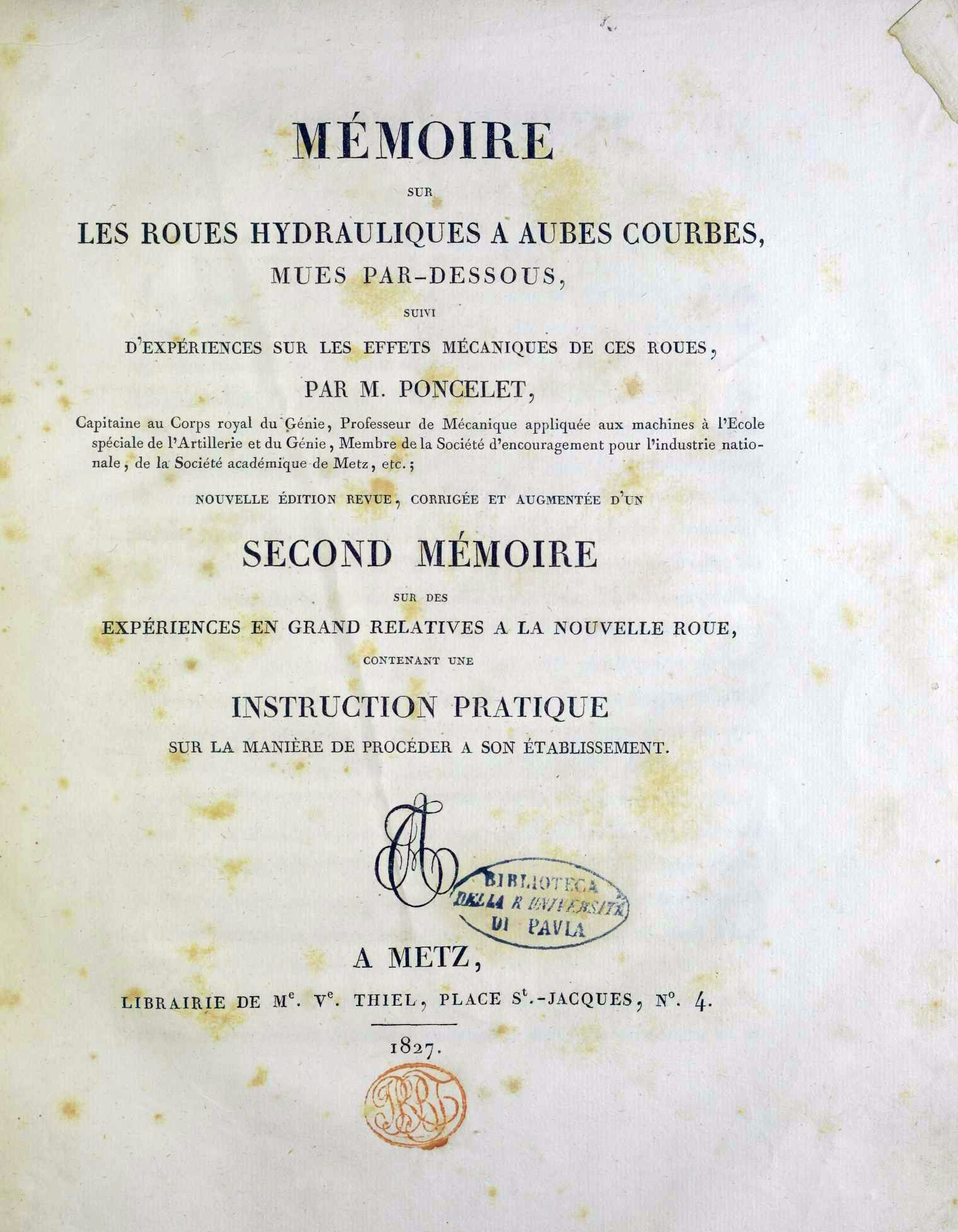
Mémoire sur les roues hydrauliques a aubes courbes, mues par-dessous, 1827

- (1822) Traité des propriétés projectives des figures
- (1826) Cours de mécanique appliqué aux machines
- Mémoire sur les roues hydrauliques a aubes courbes, mues par-dessous (in French). Metz: veuve Thiel. 1827.
- (1829) Introduction à la mécanique industrielle
- Traité de mécanique industrielle physique ou expérimentale (in French). Vol. 1. Brugge: Schiwel. 1844.
- Traité de mécanique industrielle physique ou expérimentale (in French). Vol. 2. Brugge: Schiwel. 1844.
- Traité de mécanique industrielle physique ou expérimentale (in French). Vol. 3. Brugge: Schiwel. 1844.
- (1862/64) Applications d'analyse et de géométrie
- Cours de mécanique appliquée aux machines (in French). Vol. 1. Paris: Gauthier-Villars. 1874.
- Cours de mécanique appliquée aux machines (in French). Vol. 2. Paris: Gauthier-Villars. 1876.

== See also ==
- Poncelet, a unit of power named after him
- Poncelet Prize, a prize established in 1868 in his honor
