= Lindblad (crater) =

Crater on the Moon

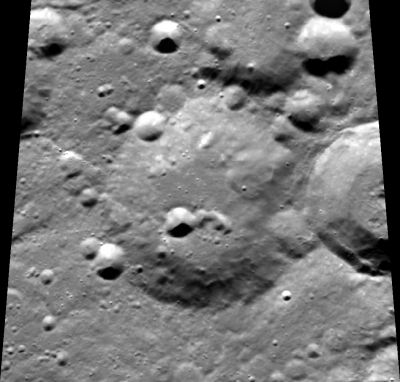
- Clementine mosaic
- Coordinates: 70.4°N 98.8°W
- Diameter: 66 km
- Depth: Unknown
- Colongitude: 100° at sunrise
- Eponym: Bertil Lindblad

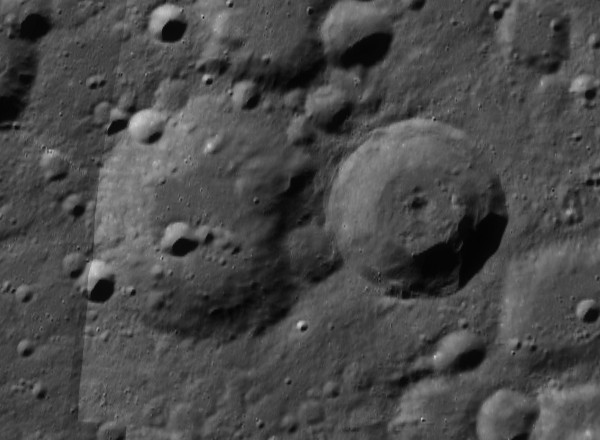
LRO mosaic of Lindblad (left) and Lindblad F (right)

Lindblad is an old lunar impact crater that is located on the far side of the Moon, just beyond the northwestern limb. This formation is located to the southeast of the crater Brianchon, and northeast of Cremona.

The fine detail along the rim of this crater has been worn down by a history of lesser impacts, leaving only a round-edged depression in the surface. The more recent impact Lindblad F intrudes slightly into the eastern rim, and several tiny craters lie along the northern and southwest rim. The interior surface is marked by a formation of adjacent craterlets just to the south and southwest of the midpoint.

== Satellite craters ==
By convention these features are identified on lunar maps by placing the letter on the side of the crater midpoint that is closest to Lindblad.

Lindblad	Latitude	Longitude	Diameter
F	70.6° N	94.3° W	42 km
S	69.7° N	104.9° W	25 km
Y	73.0° N	101.2° W	28 km
