= Poncelet =

Obsolete unit of power

poncelet
- Unit system: Non-SI metric unit
- Unit of: Power
- Symbol: p
- Named after: Jean-Victor Poncelet
- Definition: 1 p = 100 kgf⋅m/s

Conversions
1 p in ...	... is equal to ...
- SI units: 980.665 W

The poncelet (symbol p) is an obsolete unit of power, once used in France and replaced by cheval-vapeur (ch, metric horsepower). The unit was named after Jean-Victor Poncelet.

One poncelet is defined as the power required to raise a hundred-kilogram mass (quintal) at a velocity of one metre per second (100 kilogram-force·m/s).

1 p = 980.665 W = 4/3 ch ≈ 1.315 hp (imperial horsepower)
