= Bertil Lindblad =

Swedish astronomer (1895–1965)

- Born: 26 November 1895; Örebro, Sweden
- Died: 25 June 1965 (aged 69); Saltsjöbaden. Sweden
- Known for: Lindblad resonance
- Scientific career
- Fields: Astronomy

Bertil Lindblad (26 November 1895 – 25 June 1965) was a Swedish astronomer.

After finishing his secondary education at Örebro högre allmänna läroverk, Lindblad matriculated at Uppsala University in 1914. He received his filosofie magister degree in 1917, his filosofie licentiat degree in 1918 and completed his doctorate and became a docent at the university in 1920. From 1927 he was professor and astronomer of the Royal Swedish Academy of Sciences and head of the Stockholm Observatory. In the latter capacity he was responsible for the observatory's move from the old building in the centre of Stockholm to a newly built facility in Saltsjöbaden Observatory, which was opened in 1931.

Lindblad studied the theory of the rotation of galaxies. By making careful observations of the apparent motions of stars, he was able to study the rotation of the Milky Way. He deduced that the rate of rotation of the stars in the outer part of the galaxy, where the Sun is located, decreased with distance from the galactic core. This deduction was soon confirmed by Jan Oort in 1927. A certain class of resonances in rotating stellar or gaseous disks are named Lindblad resonances, after Bertil Lindblad.

His son, Per Olof Lindblad, also became an astronomer.

== Honors ==
Awards

- Janssen Medal from the French Academy of Sciences (1938)
- Prix Jules Janssen, the highest award of the Société astronomique de France, the French astronomical society (1949)
- Gold Medal of the Royal Astronomical Society (1948)
- Bruce Medal (1954)

Named after him

- Lindblad (crater) on the Moon
- Asteroid 1448 Lindbladia

Non-profit organization positions
Preceded by Arne Tiselius	Chairman of the Nobel Foundation; 1965–1965	Succeeded by Ulf von Euler
