= Lindblad resonance =

Phenomenon in astrophysics

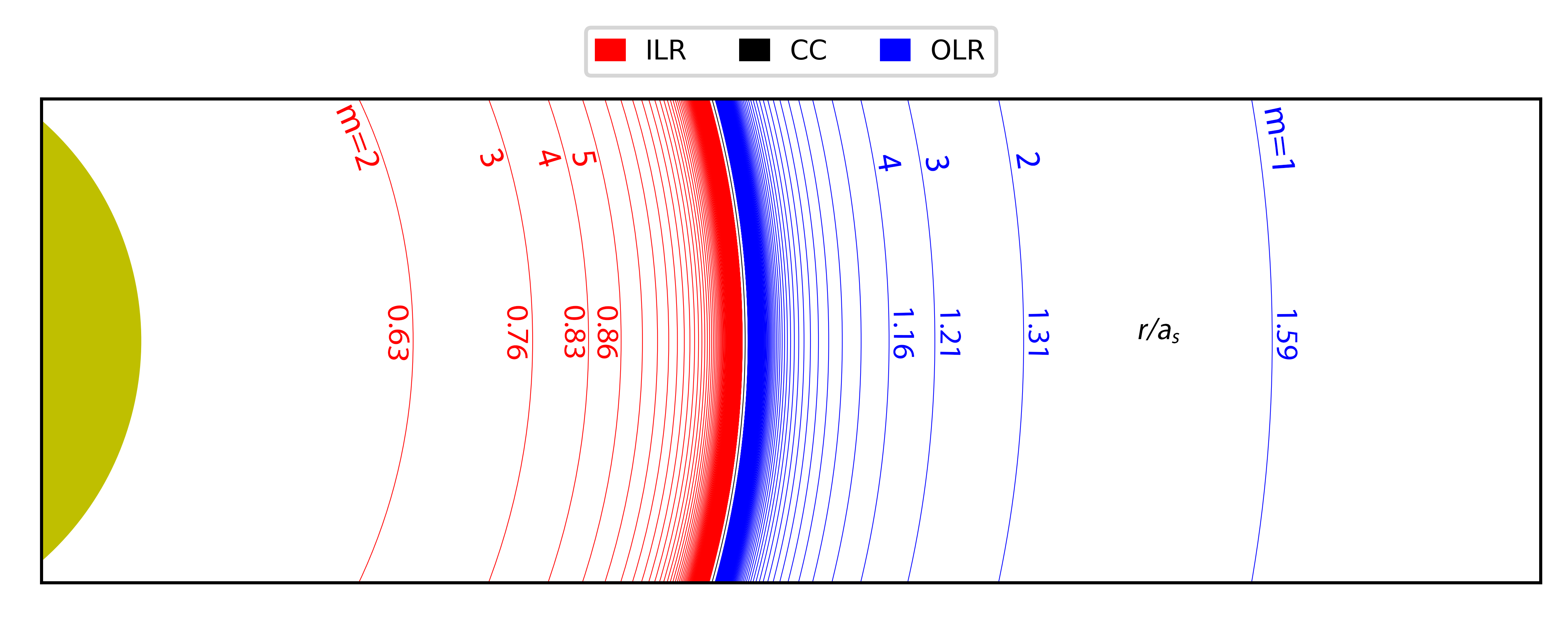
The radii of a satellite's mth inner (ILR) and outer (OLR) Lindblad resonances relative to the satellite's orbit, located at the corotation circle (CC).

A Lindblad resonance, named for the Swedish galactic astronomer Bertil Lindblad, is an orbital resonance in which an object's epicyclic frequency (the rate at which one periapse follows another) is a simple multiple of some forcing frequency. Resonances of this kind tend to increase the object's orbital eccentricity and to cause its longitude of periapse to line up in phase with the forcing. Lindblad resonances drive spiral density waves both in galaxies (where stars are subject to forcing by the spiral arms themselves) and in Saturn's rings (where ring particles are subject to forcing by Saturn's moons).

Lindblad resonances affect stars at such distances from a disc galaxy's centre where the natural frequency of the radial component of a star's orbital velocity is close to the frequency of the gravitational potential maxima encountered during its course through the spiral arms. If a star's orbital speed around the galactic centre is greater than that of the part of the spiral arm through which it is passing, then an inner Lindblad resonance occurs—if smaller, then an outer Lindblad resonance. At an inner resonance, a star's orbital speed is increased, moving the star outwards, and decreased for an outer resonance causing inward movement.
