= Charles Julien Brianchon =

French mathematician and chemist

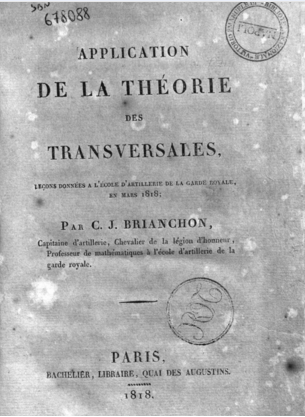
- Front page of Théorie des Transversales (1818) by Charles Julien Brianchon (1783-1864)
- Born: 19 December 1783; Sèvres
- Died: 29 April 1864 (aged 80); Versailles
- Education: École Polytechnique
- Known for: Brianchon's theorem
- Scientific career
- Fields: mathematics chemistry

Charles Julien Brianchon (19 December 1783 – 29 April 1864) was a French mathematician and chemist.

== Life ==
He entered into the École Polytechnique in 1804 at the age of eighteen, and studied under Monge, graduating first in his class in 1808, after which he took up a career as a lieutenant in Napoleon's artillery. Later, in 1818, Brianchon became a professor in the Artillery School of the Royal Guard at Vincennes.

== Work ==
Brianchon is best known for his proof of Brianchon's theorem (1810).

His book Mémoire sur les lignes du second ordre (Paris, 1817) is available online at the Internet Archive.

== Bibliography ==
- Brianchon, Charles-Julien. Mémoire sur les lignes du second ordre. Paris, 1817. Online at the Internet Archive.
