= Lu Jiaxi (mathematician) =

Chinese mathematician

Lu Jiaxi 陆家羲
- Born: June 10, 1935; Shanghai, China
- Died: October 31, 1983 (aged 48); Baotou, Inner Mongolia, China
- Education: Northeast Normal University
- Known for: Proving the existence of large sets of disjoint Steiner triple systems for all orders larger than 7 (except possibly six values whose proof he left unfinished)
- Awards: First Class Award of the State Natural Science Award (1987); Special Class Award of the Inner Mongolia Autonomous Region Science and Technology Progress Award (1985)
- Scientific career
- Fields: Combinatorics
- Workplaces: Middle schools in Baotou

Lu Jiaxi (simplified Chinese: 陆家羲; traditional Chinese: 陸家羲; pinyin: Lù Jiāxī; June 10, 1935 – October 31, 1983) was a self-taught Chinese mathematician who made important contributions in combinatorial design theory. He was a high school physics teacher in a remote city and worked in his spare time on the problem of large sets of disjoint Steiner triple systems.

== Biography ==
=== Background ===
Lu Jiaxi was born in a poor family in Shanghai. His father was a seller of soy sauce concentrate. His parents had four children, but the three older children all died early from illness, and Lu Jiaxi was the only surviving child.

When he was in junior middle school, his father died from an illness that the family could not afford to treat, so he started working after finishing junior middle school in 1949 to earn a living. He served an apprenticeship at an automobile hardware firm in Shanghai. In October 1951, he was admitted to a statistics training course in Shenyang offered by the administration for electrical equipment industry of Northeast China, and he finished first in his class. He was then assigned to a motor factory in Harbin.

While working at the factory, he self-studied high school materials. He also learned Russian at a night school, and later English and Japanese to be able to look up literature. In 1956, he joined the fight against the flooding of Songhua River, for which he was commended. In 1957, he passed the college entrance exam and was admitted to Department of Physics of Jilin Normal University, now called Northeast Normal University (not the university that took the same name in 2002).

After graduation in 1961, he was assigned to Baotou Steel and Iron Institute, now called Inner Mongolia University of Science and Technology, as a teaching assistant. In 1962, after reorganization of the institute, he was assigned first to the Teaching and Research Office of Baotou Education Bureau, then to several middle schools in Baotou as a physics teacher. He worked at Baotou Eighth Middle School, Baotou Fifth Middle School, Baotou Twenty-fourth Middle School from 1965 to 1973, and Baotou Ninth Middle School from 1973 to his death in 1983. Because of his physics background and his past experience as a factory worker, he was also in charge of a school-run factory which produced radio components. He married in the summer of 1972 to a doctor introduced by his colleague.

=== Mathematical research ===
In the summer of 1956, he read a popular science book on mathematical problems written by Chinese mathematician Sun Zeying (Chinese: 孙泽瀛, published under the name J. Tseying Sun) called Shuxue Fangfa Qu Yin (Chinese: 數學方法趣引; lit. 'Interesting introduction to mathematics methods') and was fascinated by the Kirkman's schoolgirl problem. He devoted himself into solving the generalized version of the problem, studying relevant areas in mathematics on his own and spending a lot of time on research.

In December 1961, he wrote up a paper on its solution and another paper on Latin squares and sent them to Institute of Mathematics of the Chinese Academy of Sciences. The reply letter came in February 1963. They did not directly comment on the papers but suggested that he check them himself and send them to journals if the results were new. They also included some references on the latest developments. He revised his paper on the generalized Kirkman's schoolgirl problem and submitted it to Shuxue Tongbao (Chinese: 数学通报; lit. 'Bulletin of mathematics') in March 1963. His paper was too long and technical for the journal, which aimed at middle school teachers. However, it took the journal one year to reply to him, stating that he should submit it elsewhere. After further revisions, he submitted the paper to Acta Mathematica Sinica on March 14, 1965. On February 7, 1966, he received the rejection letter from the journal criticizing it as "basically not really new results, worthless". It was realized after his death that this rejection was a serious mistake. In 1966, he sent two other papers to journals with no response, since with the start of the Cultural Revolution all academic activities were disrupted. He was discouraged by the rejections and wrote in his diary that he "had since then given up the thought of submitting papers".

After the Cultural Revolution, he resubmitted some revised papers, but they were not accepted. In April 1979, in some journal issues of 1974 and 1975 that he managed to borrow from Beijing, he unexpectedly learned from a paper of Haim Hanani that the problem which he solved in his 1965 paper had been solved and first published in 1971 by Ray-Chaudhuri and R. M. Wilson, which was a big blow to him.

He went on to tackle the problem of large sets of disjoint Steiner triple systems. Zhu Lie (Chinese: 朱烈), a professor of mathematics at Soochow University working also in combinatorial mathematics, realized the importance of his work and suggested that he submit it to the international journal Journal of Combinatorial Theory, Series A. He wrote to its editorial board that he had essentially solved the problem, and the editors replied to him that if what he said was true, it would be a major achievement. (Many leaders in the field had worked on the problem starting from Séverin Bays in 1917. Only a few special cases were solved at the time. A note published by Curt Lindner in 1981 said: "[A]n extensive amount of work has been done on [this] problem ... This problem remains far from settled however".) So he brushed up his English and borrowed a typewriter to type up his work. It was a tremendous task for him as he could type at most four pages a night. He submitted a total of nearly 200 typed pages to the journal.

The journal received six of his series of papers between September 1981 and March 1983 and published the first three in March 1983. The editors informed him that they would also publish his next three papers. He also sent a paper on resolvable balanced incomplete block designs to Acta Mathematica Sinica in August 1979, and a revised version was received by the journal in September 1983. This paper was published in July 1984 and was regarded as equally important by international experts.

In spite of his heavy teaching duties, he carried on with his private mathematical research, often working until after midnight. He also made occasional trips to Beijing to find library resources. He told his colleagues that while he liked physics more, certain material conditions were required for physics research, but he only needed paper to do mathematics.

Unfortunately, laborious work and harsh living conditions made his health deteriorate over time. His family of four lived in a small house of ten-odd square meters. The only table at home was used by his daughters, so he had to do his calculations on a broken kang bed-stove. On his trips to Beijing, he bought hard seat tickets since he could not afford sleeper tickets. He ate his dried food in a library in the daytime and slept on a bench in a train station at night. He sometimes wrote in his diary about how his mental fatigue affected his research and his teaching, and that he needed to get healthier for his research. After he had received dozens of copies of the journal issue containing his first three papers, his family and friends reminded him to get some rest, but he said that he could not since he had not much time. To have a better research environment, he tried to get transferred to university with his friends' help since 1978, but he could not find any suitable position after several years of effort.

=== Late recognition and death ===
His Western peers discovered a leader in the field with exceptional achievements, while he still remained largely unknown to the Chinese mathematical community. In the first ever combinatorial mathematics conference in China held in Dalian in July 1983, when two Canadian mathematicians Eric Mendelsohn and John Adrian Bondy, who were the referees of Lu's papers, arrived and asked for Lu Jiaxi, one of the organizers thought they were looking for the President of the Chinese Academy of Sciences with the same sounding name. It was the first time the Chinese combinatorialists got to know him. Upon hearing Lu present his work in a session, Wu Lisheng of Soochow University recommended that he should give a talk on it at the closing ceremony. After his talk, he received a unanimous accolade. In August, he took part in a combinatorics workshop in Hefei as a helper and gave a talk there.

Although he had gained recognition from scholars in his field, he was still living in poverty. School leaders did not appreciate his engagement in research, seeing it as a deviation from his work duties. They even assigned him more duties such as timekeeping on sports day to keep him occupied. In a school general meeting, the principal reprimanded him, saying, "We are a middle school. Someone wants to be a scientist, he may as well be transferred to the Academy of Sciences." When he was finally invited to mathematical conferences in China, his middle school refused to support his travel fee, saying that according to the rules allowances were provided only for teaching related activities. He had to borrow from his friends to attend the conferences.

The conferences brought him into the mathematical community. He was invited as a speaker to the fourth national conference of the Chinese Mathematical Society in late October. Several universities in China wanted to offer him positions, and he decided to go to South China Normal University. The Canadian mathematicians were planning to invite him for a visit at University of Toronto.

After attending the national conference of the Chinese Mathematical Society in Wuhan, which ended on October 27, he hurried back to Baotou by train in order not to miss his classes. After stopping briefly at Beijing for the libraries, he arrived home at about 6 in the evening of Sunday, October 30, 1983. He told his wife joyfully about the praises he received in the last few months and his future research plan. At about 1 am that night, he suffered from a sudden heart attack in his sleep and died. Although his wife was a doctor, she did not have any equipment to save him, not even a telephone at home to call for help. He was survived by his wife Zhang Shuqin (Chinese: 张淑琴) and two daughters.

Only two days before his death, his middle school received a letter from the President of University of Toronto David Strangway written on September 30. In the letter, he asked the school principal for permission to transfer Lu to a university for the development of Chinese mathematics. On November 23, David Strangway sent a letter of condolences to Lu's middle school and family, in which he said that people would greatly miss "Prof. Lu Jiaxi" for his knowledge and contributions.

In January 1984, an editor of Mathematical Reviews sent Lu an invitation letter to be a reviewer, not knowing of his death.

After his death, the Inner Mongolia government helped his family repay their debts and honored him for his achievements. On the first anniversary of his death, a memorial gathering was held by the government officials at Baotou First Workers' Cultural Palace, and the Chairman of the Autonomous Region issued a document titled "Learn from Comrade Lu Jiaxi" (Chinese: 向陆家羲同志学习). He was given Special Class Award in the first Inner Mongolia Autonomous Region Science and Technology Progress Award in 1985.

An investigation on his research was carried out by a number of Chinese mathematicians. Although his 1961 and 1963 papers were lost, they found the manuscript of his 1965 paper and confirmed that it was the first paper to solve the generalized Kirkman's schoolgirl problem completely. In fact, according to Zhu Lie, it contained an asymptotically stronger result than that in the paper by Ray-Chaudhuri and Wilson.

Eric Mendelsohn praised Lu's large set theorem as one of the most significant achievements in the field in the past 20 years. He wrote an article on Lu's work, in which he regretted that "Lu Jia-xi should have had a distinguished career as a mathematician. ... He, however, spent too many years as a high school teacher with virtually no time to do research and virtually no contact with the research community".

The seventh paper in the series on disjoint Steiner triple systems treating the cases for the last six values in the theorem, which he had announced to have solved in the Dalian combinatorial mathematics conference, was left unfinished as a 24-page manuscript, with an outline and a few results. (Actually, once the cases for three of the values were proved, the cases for the other three values would follow immediately from previous results.) A few Chinese mathematicians tried to use the procedure sketched in the manuscript or other methods to solve the cases without success. The very last part of the theorem the proof of which Lu had not finished writing down before his death was finally completed by Luc Teirlinck in 1989. Although Teirlinck's proof did not follow the outline in the manuscript, it nevertheless made use of the combinatorial structures that Lu had constructed.

Lu Jiaxi was awarded posthumously in 1987 the First Class Award of the State Natural Science Award, then the highest honor in science in China, for his work on large sets of disjoint Steiner triple systems.

== Bibliography ==
=== Published papers ===
- Lu Jia-Xi (March 1983). "On Large Sets of Disjoint Steiner Triple Systems I" (PDF). Journal of Combinatorial Theory, Series A. 34 (2): 140–146. doi:10.1016/0097-3165(83)90052-3.
- Lu Jia-Xi (March 1983). "On Large Sets of Disjoint Steiner Triple Systems II" (PDF). Journal of Combinatorial Theory, Series A. 34 (2): 147–155. doi:10.1016/0097-3165(83)90053-5.
- Lu Jia-Xi (March 1983). "On Large Sets of Disjoint Steiner Triple Systems III" (PDF). Journal of Combinatorial Theory, Series A. 34 (2): 156–182. doi:10.1016/0097-3165(83)90054-7.
- Lu Jia-Xi (September 1984). "On Large Sets of Disjoint Steiner Triple Systems IV" (PDF). Journal of Combinatorial Theory, Series A. 37 (2): 136–163. doi:10.1016/0097-3165(84)90066-9.
- Lu Jia-Xi (September 1984). "On Large Sets of Disjoint Steiner Triple Systems V" (PDF). Journal of Combinatorial Theory, Series A. 37 (2): 164–188. doi:10.1016/0097-3165(84)90067-0.
- Lu Jia-Xi (September 1984). "On Large Sets of Disjoint Steiner Triple Systems VI" (PDF). Journal of Combinatorial Theory, Series A. 37 (2): 189–192. doi:10.1016/0097-3165(84)90068-2.
- Lu Jiaxi (July 1984). "可分解平衡不完全区组设计的存在性理论" [An existence theory for Resolvable Balanced Incomplete Block Designs]. Acta Mathematica Sinica (in Chinese). 27 (4): 458–468. [An English translation: Therese C. Y. Lee; Steven C. Furino (1995). "A translation of J. X. Lu's 'An existence theory for resolvable balanced incomplete block designs'". Journal of Combinatorial Designs. 3 (5): 321–340. doi:10.1002/jcd.3180030503.]

=== Some unpublished papers ===
See the reference for a more complete list.

- Lu Jiaxi (1961), 应用组合系列制作正交拉丁方的一些结果 [Some results on applying combinatorial series to construct orthogonal Latin squares] (in Chinese)
- Lu Jiaxi (1961), 寇克满系列和斯坦纳系列的制作方法 [Construction Methods for Kirkman's Series and Steiner's Series] (in Chinese)
- Lu Jiaxi (1965), 平衡不完全区组与可分解平衡不完全区组的构造方法 [Construction Methods for Balanced Incomplete Block Designs and Resolvable Balanced Incomplete Block Designs] (in Chinese)
- Lu Jiaxi (1983), On Large Sets of Disjoint Steiner Triple Systems VII (unfinished)

=== Book ===
- Lu Jiaxi (1990). Wu Lisheng; Zhu Lie; Kang Qingde (eds.). Collected Works of Lu Jiaxi on Combinatorial Designs. Huhhot: Inner Mongolia People's Press. This book contains his published papers and his 1965 paper, with the two papers originally in Chinese translated into English.
