= Lu Jiaxi =

Lu Jiaxi may refer to:

- Lu Jiaxi (chemist)
- Lu Jiaxi (mathematician)
- Lu Jiaxi (tennis player)
