= Thomas Kirkman (disambiguation) =

Thomas Kirkman was a mathematician and church minister.

Thomas Kirkman may also refer to:

- Thomas Kirkman, fictional character in Fable: The Balverine Order
- Tom Kirkman, fictional president of the United States in Designated Survivor
