= Guorui Jiang =

Academic

Guorui Jiang is a professor of Information Management and Information Systems, as well as an associate dean of the Economics and Management School at Beijing University of Technology, where he leads the multi-agent supply chain group in Business Intelligence Laboratory.

In 1982, Guorui worked as a teacher at Hebei Normal University after graduating from the department of mathematics in this school. In 1994, he obtained Ph.D. from Chinese Academy of Sciences; September 1997-January 1999, he visited Department of Computer Science, Tsinghua University as a scholar. September 1999-July 2001, he did postdoctoral research in Columbia College (Missouri), United States. Since 2002, he engaged in teaching and research work at Beijing University of Technology.

His research covers both the science and the engineering of Management information systems. Specifically, he took fundamental research on Multi-agent supply-chain management, argumentation negotiation. He pioneered the application of multi-agent technology; developing some of the forecasting, early warning and negotiation system based on Multi-agent.

Guorui had published over 160 articles in Journal of Industrial Engineering and Engineering Management, Journal of Management Sciences, Acta Mathematica Sinica, Application Research of Computers et al. which covered the field of management, mathematics, computer science and technology; he completed more than 30 research reports and research consulting for the Beijing municipal government or enterprises; published more than 10 textbooks, including planning materials " IT Project Management", "Project Human Resource Management" for master of Engineering in Project Management; more than 100 graduate students were graduated by his instruction; teaching multiple management, computer and mathematics courses for undergraduates and graduate students; Achieved numbers of honorable awards such as school excellent teacher and advanced worker, provincial young and middle-aged experts with outstanding contributions, three province progress prize in science and technology.

Guorui was an executive member of the council of China Information Economics Society; member of a council of Project Management Research Committee China (PMRC); member of International Information System Society, 2011-2013 Decision Sciences Institute Publications Committee member, 2012-2013 Decision Sciences Institute Committee member; Co-chair of the Academic Committee of International Conference, Cooperative editor of Proceedings of ICCGI2008 /ICISO2009 /ICISO2010.

== Main works ==
1. Guorui Jiang. Multi-Agent manufacturing supply chain management, Science Press, January 2013. ISBN 978-7-03-036060-1
2. Guorui Jiang, Ying Liu, Xijun He. "Differential production and marketing games for the supply chain under promotional demand". Journal of Industrial Engineering and Engineering Management, 2012,4(6):65-70.
3. Ge Zhang, Guorui iang, Tiyun Huang. "Argument generation and decision process in multi-agent argumentation-based negotiation oriented to e-commerce". Operations Research and Management Science, 2011, (2):7-14.
4. Hanlin Zhang, Guorui Jiang, Tiyun Huang. "A collaborative planning approach in supply chains for global optimization with limited information shared". Journal of Industrial Engineering and Engineering Management.2010 (2):153-159.
5. Guorui Jiang, Hai Qing, Tiyun Huang. "A personalized recommendation algorithm based on associative sets". Journal of Service Science and Management, 2009 (4): 400–403.
6. Shuliang Zhao, Guorui Jiang, Tiyun Huang, "Trust model of multi-agent system", Journal of management sciences in China, 2006, 9(5):36-43.
7. Guorui Jiang, Junqiang Lan, Xinhua Zhuang. "Distance learning technologies and an interactive multimedia educational system". IEEE International Conference on Advanced Learning Technologies, Madison, WI, Aug 06–08, 2001 .405-408. doi:10.1109/ICALT.2001.943958
8. Guorui Jiang, Yuzhuo Zhong, Shiqiang Yang, Bo Yuan. "Fast fractal image compression based on HV partition". Proceedings of the 1999 Multimedia Storage and Archiving Systems, IV, SPIE, Boston, MA, USA, September 20–22, 1999. 473–481. doi:10.1117/12.360451
9. Guorui Jiang. "Manifolds with involutions having（∪αP（2ri+1）∪（∪Snj）as their fixed point set". Acta Mathematica Sinica, 1996, 39(3):326-335. Zbl 0869.57040
10. Guorui Jiang. "Algebraic structure of ideal imσ*2k+1". Chinese Science Bulletin,1990, 4(35):345-345.
