= Pierre Baldi =

American computer science professor

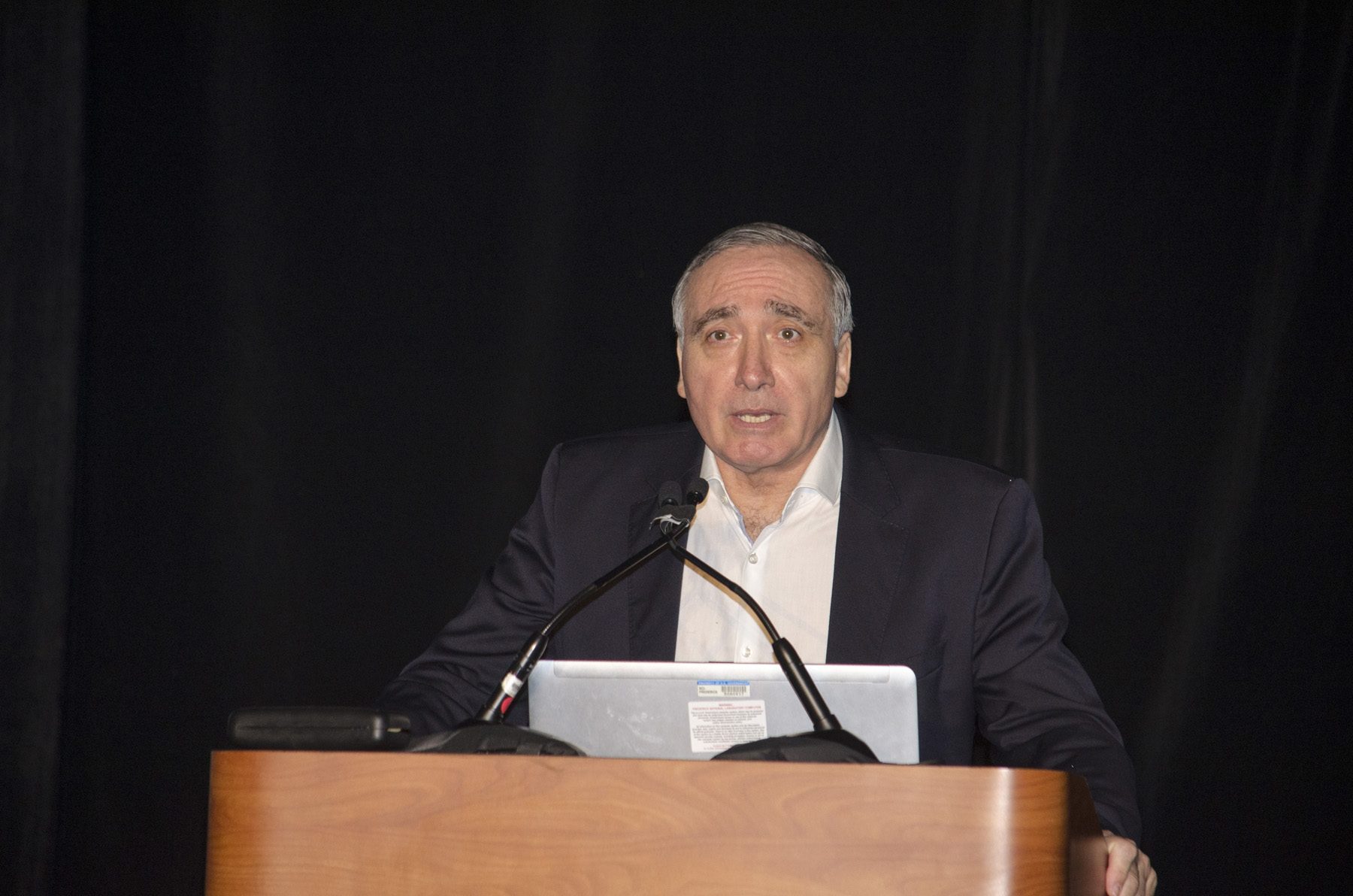
- Pierre Baldi in 2016
- Born: Rome, Italy
- Education: University of Paris (BSc); California Institute of Technology (PhD)
- Awards: ISCB Fellow (2013); ACM Fellow (2012); IEEE Fellow (2011); FAAAS (2008); AAAI Fellow (2007)
- Scientific career
- Fields: Artificial Intelligence; Machine Learning; Bioinformatics; Systems Biology; Mathematics
- Workplaces: Donald Bren School of Information and Computer Sciences; University of California Irvine; University of California, San Diego
- Thesis: I: On a Family of Generalized Colorings. II: Some Contributions to the Theory of Neural Networks. III: Embeddings of Ultrametric Spaces
- Doctoral advisor: R. M. Wilson
- Website: www.igb.uci.edu/~pfbaldi

Pierre Baldi is an Italian American computer scientists who is a distinguished professor of computer science at University of California Irvine and the director of its Institute for Genomics and Bioinformatics.

== Education and early life ==
Born in Rome (Italy), Pierre Baldi received his Bachelor of Science and Master of Science degrees at the University of Paris, in France. He then obtained his Ph.D. degree in mathematics at the California Institute of Technology in 1986 supervised by R. M. Wilson.

== Career and research ==
From 1986 to 1988, he was a postdoctoral fellow at the University of California, San Diego. From 1988 to 1995, he held faculty and member of the technical staff positions at the California Institute of Technology and at the Jet Propulsion Laboratory, where he was awarded the Lew Allen Award for Excellence in 1993. He was CEO of a start up company called Net-ID from 1995 to 1999 and joined University of California, Irvine in 1999.

Baldi's research is focused on understanding intelligence in brains and machines, through the study of the mathematical foundations of artificial intelligence, machine learning, and deep learning, and their applications to problems in the natural sciences, physics, chemistry, and biology.

=== Publications ===
Baldi has over 400 publications in his field of research and five books:

- "Deep Learning in Science." Pierre Baldi. Cambridge University Press. 2021. ISBN 978-1108845359
- "Bioinformatics: the Machine Learning Approach." Pierre Baldi and Soren Brunak. MIT Press, 1998; 2nd Edition, 2001, ISBN 978-0262025065.
- "Modeling the Internet and the Web. Probabilistic Methods and Algorithms," Pierre Baldi, Paolo Frasconi and Padhraic Smyth. Wiley editors, 2003. ISBN 978-0470849064
- "The Shattered Self—The End of Natural Evolution." Pierre Baldi. MIT Press, 2001. ISBN 978-0262025027
- "DNA Microarrays and Gene Regulation." Pierre Baldi and G. Wesley Hatfield. Cambridge University Press, 2002. ISBN 978-0521176354

=== Awards and honors ===
Baldi is a fellow of the Association for the Advancement of Artificial Intelligence (AAAI), the AAAS, the IEEE, and the Association for Computing Machinery (ACM). He is also the recipient of the 2010 Eduardo R. Caianiello Prize for Scientific Contributions to the field of Neural Networks and a fellow of the International Society for Computational Biology (ISCB).
