= Haim Hanani =

Israeli mathematician

Haim Hanani (Chaim Chojnacki)
- חיים חנני
- Born: 11 September 1912; Słupca, Poland
- Died: 8 April 1991 (aged 78)
- Education: Hebrew University
- Scientific career
- Fields: Mathematics
- Thesis: A contribution to the four color problem (1938)

Haim Hanani (Hebrew: חיים חנני; 11 September 1912 as Chaim Chojnacki– 8 April 1991) was a Polish-born Israeli mathematician, known for his contributions to combinatorial design theory, in particular for the theory of pairwise balanced designs and for the proof of an existence theorem for Steiner quadruple systems. He is also known for the Hanani–Tutte theorem on odd crossings in non-planar graphs.

== Life ==
Hanani (Chojnacki) was born in Poland, studied in Vienna and Warsaw, and graduated with an M.A. from the University of Warsaw in 1934. He emigrated to the British Mandate of Palestine, later to become Israel, in 1935 and in 1938 received the first Ph.D. in Mathematics from the Hebrew University of Jerusalem.

In 1955 he was appointed to the faculty at Technion Institute of Technology and from 1969 to 1973 he served as the rector of Ben-Gurion University in Beersheba. In 1980 he was awarded the title of Professor Emeritus at that institution.

His early research led to the proof of the theorem devised by Richard M. Wilson on pairwise balance designs.

He wrote scholarly papers with Andries Brouwer, Paul Erdős, Alexander Schrijver, and Richard M. Wilson, among others.

His papers were published in journals such as Discrete Mathematics, the Journal of Combinatorial Theory, the European Journal of Combinatorics, and the American Mathematical Monthly.

== Academic papers ==
- Haim Hanani; Alan Hartman; Earl S. Kramer (1983). "On three-designs of small order". Discrete Mathematics. 45 (1): 75–97. doi:10.1016/0012-365X(83)90177-2.
- Haim Hanani (1979). "A Class of Three-Designs". Journal of Combinatorial Theory. 26 (1): 1–19. doi:10.1016/0097-3165(79)90050-5.
- H. Hanani (1975). "Balanced incomplete block designs and related designs". Discrete Mathematics. 11 (3): 255–369. doi:10.1016/0012-365X(75)90040-0.
- Haim Hanani (1974). "On Resolvable Balanced Incomplete Block Designs". Journal of Combinatorial Theory. 17 (3): 275–289. doi:10.1016/0097-3165(74)90093-4.
- H. Hanani (1972). "On resolvable designs". Discrete Mathematics. 3 (4): 343–357. doi:10.1016/0012-365X(72)90091-X.
- Haim Hanani (1972). "On Balanced Incomplete Block Designs with Blocks Having Five Elements". Journal of Combinatorial Theory. 12 (2): 184–201. doi:10.1016/0097-3165(72)90035-0.
- P. Erdős; H. Hanani (1963). "On a limit theorem in combinatorical analysis". Publicationes Mathematicae Debrecen. 10 (1–4): 10–13. doi:10.5486/PMD.1963.10.1-4.02. S2CID 253788338.
- Hanani, H. (1971). "Truncated finite planes". Combinatorics. Proceedings of Symposia in Pure Mathematics. Vol. 19. pp. 115–120. doi:10.1090/pspum/019/0321765. ISBN 9780821814192.
- Hanani, H. (1970). "On the number of orthogonal Latin squares". Journal of Combinatorial Theory. 8 (3). Elsevier: 247–271. doi:10.1016/s0021-9800(70)80079-5.
- Hanani, H. (1963). "On some tactical configurations". Canadian Journal of Mathematics. 15: 702–722. doi:10.4153/cjm-1963-069-5. S2CID 124780978.
- Haim Hanani (1947). "Sur les changements des signes d'une série à termes complexes". Comptes rendus des séances de l'Académie des Sciences. 225 (225): 516–518.
- Haim Hanani (1935). "Über wesentlich unplättbar Kurven im dreidimensionale Raume". Fundamenta Mathematicae. 23: 135–142.
- Haim Hanani (1979). "Decomposition of Hypergraphs into Octahedra". Transactions of the New York Academy of Sciences. 319 (1): 260–264. Bibcode:1979NYASA.319..260H. doi:10.1111/j.1749-6632.1979.tb32799.x. S2CID 84036623.
- Haim Hanani (1976). "Resolvable designs". Colloquio Internazionale Sulle Teorie Combinatorie. 17. Atti dei Convegni Lincei Roma: 249–252.
- Haim Hanani; E. Netanyahu; M. Reichaw (1968). "Eigenvalues of infinite matrices". Colloquium Mathematicum. 19: 89–101. doi:10.4064/cm-19-1-89-101.
- Haim Hanani; D. Orenstein; V.T. Sós (1964). "On the lottery problem". Publications of the Mathematical Institute of the Hungarian Academy of Sciences. 9 (8): 155–158.
- Haim Hanani (1960). "A note on Steiner triple systems". Math. Scandinavica. 8: 154–156. doi:10.7146/math.scand.a-10603.
- Haim Hanani (1951). "On the number of straight lines determined by η points". Riveon Lematematika. 5: 10–11.
