= Dijen K. Ray-Chaudhuri =

Indian mathematician (born 1933)

D. K. Ray-Chaudhuri
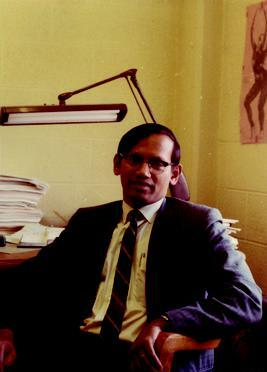
- Born: November 1 1933
- Education: Rajabazar Science College (University of Calcutta); University of North Carolina at Chapel Hill
- Known for: BCH code Kirkman's schoolgirl problem
- Awards: Euler Medal (1999)
- Scientific career
- Fields: Combinatorics
- Workplaces: Ohio State University
- Doctoral advisor: Raj Chandra Bose

Dwijendra Kumar Ray-Chaudhuri (born November 1, 1933) is an Indian-American mathematician and professor emeritus at Ohio State University. He and his student R. M. Wilson together solved the long-standing Kirkman's schoolgirl problem in 1968, which contributed to developments in design theory.

He received his M.Sc. (1956) in mathematics from the famous Rajabazar Science College, University of Calcutta and Ph.D. in combinatorics (1959) from University of North Carolina at Chapel Hill. He served as consultant at Cornell Medicine and Sloan Kettering, a professor and chairman of the Department of Mathematics at Ohio State University, as well as a visiting professor of University of Göttingen and University of Erlangen in Germany, University of London, and Tata Institute of Fundamental Research in Mumbai.

He is best known for his work in design theory and the theory of error-correcting codes, in which the class of BCH codes is partly named after him and his Ph.D. advisor Bose. Ray-Chaudhuri is the recipient of the Euler Medal by the Institute of Combinatorics and its Applications for his career contributions to combinatorics. In 2000, a festschrift appeared on the occasion of his 65th birthday. In 2012 he became a fellow of the American Mathematical Society.

== Honors, Awards, and Fellowships ==
- Senior U.S. Scientist Award of the Humboldt Foundation of Germany
- Distinguished Senior Research Award from Ohio State University
- President for Forum in New Delhi
- Foundation Fellow of the ICA
- Euler Medal of ICA.
- Fellow of the American Mathematical Society.

== Selected publications ==
- R. C. Bose and D. K. Ray-Chaudhuri: On a class of error correcting binary group codes. Information and Control 3(1): 68-79 (March 1960).
- C. T. Abraham, S. P Ghosh and D. K. Ray-Chaudhuri: File organization schemes based on finite geometries. Information and control, 1968.
- D. K. Ray-Chaudhuri and R. M. Wilson: Solution of Kirkman's schoolgirl problem. Proc. symp. pure Math, 1971.
- D. K. Ray-Chaudhuri and R. M. Wilson: On t-designs. Osaka Journal of Mathematics 1975.
