= R. M. Wilson =

American mathematician

- Born: Richard Michael Wilson; 23 November 1945 (age 80); Gary, Indiana, US
- Education: Indiana University (BS); Ohio State University (MS, PhD)
- Known for: Kirkman's schoolgirl problem
- Scientific career
- Fields: Combinatorics
- Workplaces: Caltech
- Doctoral advisor: Dijen K. Ray-Chaudhuri
- Doctoral students: Jeff Dinitz; Pierre Baldi
- Website: www.pma.caltech.edu/people/richard-m-wilson

Richard Michael Wilson (23 November 1945) is a mathematician and a professor emeritus at the California Institute of Technology. Wilson and his PhD supervisor Dijen K. Ray-Chaudhuri, solved Kirkman's schoolgirl problem in 1968. Wilson is known for his work in combinatorial mathematics, as well as on historical flutes.

== Education ==
Wilson was educated at Indiana University where he was awarded a Bachelor of Science degree in 1966. followed by a Master of Science degree from Ohio State University in 1968. His PhD, also from Ohio State University was awarded in 1969 for research supervised by Dijen K. Ray-Chaudhuri.

== Career and research ==
His breakthrough in pairwise balanced designs, and orthogonal Latin squares built upon the groundwork set before him, by R. C. Bose, E. T. Parker, S. S. Shrikhande, and Haim Hanani are widely referenced in combinatorial design theory and coding theory.

== Musical career ==
Wilson is also one of the world's top experts on historical flutes.
