= Thomas Kirkman =

British church minister and mathematician (1806–1895)

Thomas Penyngton Kirkman
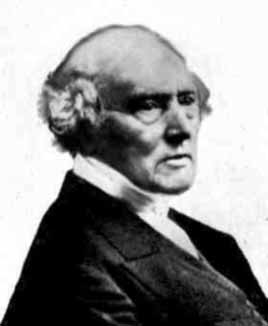
- Born: 31 March 1806; Bolton, Lancashire, England
- Died: 3 February 1895 (aged 88); Bowdon near Manchester, England
- Occupations: Mathematician, Minister
- Known for: Kirkman's schoolgirl problem

Thomas Penyngton Kirkman FRS (31 March 1806 – 3 February 1895) was a British mathematician and ordained minister of the Church of England. Despite being primarily a churchman, he maintained an active interest in research-level mathematics, and was listed by Alexander Macfarlane as one of ten leading 19th-century British mathematicians. In the 1840s, he obtained an existence theorem for Steiner triple systems that founded the field of combinatorial design theory, while the related Kirkman's schoolgirl problem is named after him.

== Early life and education ==
Kirkman was born 31 March 1806 in Bolton, in the north west of England, the son of a local cotton dealer. In his schooling at the Bolton Grammar School, he studied classics, but no mathematics was taught in the school. He was recognised as the best scholar at the school, and the local vicar guaranteed him a scholarship at Cambridge, but his father would not allow him to go. Instead, he left school at age 14 to work in his father's office.

Nine years later, defying his father, he went to Trinity College Dublin, working as a private tutor to support himself during his studies. There, among other subjects, he first began learning mathematics. He earned a B.A. in 1833 and returned to England in 1835.

== Ordination and ministry ==
On his return to England, Kirkman was ordained into the ministry of the Church of England and became the curate in Bury and then in Lymm. In 1839 he was invited to become rector of Croft with Southworth, a newly founded parish in Lancashire, where he would stay for 52 years until his retirement in 1892. Theologically, Kirkman supported the anti-literalist position of John William Colenso, and was also strongly opposed to materialism. He published many tracts and pamphlets on theology, as well as a book Philosophy Without Assumptions (1876).

Kirkman married Eliza Wright in 1841; they had seven children. To support them, Kirkman supplemented his income with tutoring, until Eliza inherited enough property to secure their living. The rectorship itself did not demand much from Kirkman, so from this point forward he had time to devote to mathematics.

Kirkman died 4 February 1895 in Bowdon. His wife died ten days later.

== Mathematics ==
Kirkman's first mathematical publication was in the Cambridge and Dublin Mathematical Journal in 1846, on a problem involving Steiner triple systems that had been published two years earlier in The Lady's and Gentleman's Diary by Wesley S. B. Woolhouse. Despite Kirkman's and Woolhouse's contributions to the problem, Steiner triple systems were named after Jakob Steiner who wrote a later paper in 1853. Kirkman's second research paper, in 1848, concerned pluquaternions.

In 1848, Kirkman published First Mnemonical Lessons, a book on mathematical mnemonics for schoolchildren. It was not successful, and Augustus De Morgan criticised it as "the most curious crochet I ever saw".

=== Kirkman's schoolgirl problem ===
Next, in 1849, Kirkman studied the Pascal lines determined by the intersection points of opposite sides of a hexagon inscribed within a conic section. Any six points on a conic may be joined into a hexagon in 60 different ways, forming 60 different Pascal lines. Extending previous work of Steiner, Kirkman showed that these lines intersect in triples to form 60 points (now known as the Kirkman points), so that each line contains three of the points and each point lies on three of the lines. That is, these lines and points form a projective configuration of type 60_{3}60_{3}.

In 1850, Kirkman observed that his 1846 solution to Woolhouse's problem had an additional property, which he set out as a puzzle in The Lady's and Gentleman's Diary:

Fifteen young ladies in a school walk out three abreast for seven days in succession: it is required to arrange them daily, so that no two shall walk twice abreast.

This problem became known as Kirkman's schoolgirl problem, subsequently to become Kirkman's most famous result. He published several additional works on combinatorial design theory in later years.

=== Pluquaternions ===
In 1848 Kirkman wrote "On Pluquaternions and Homoid Products of n Squares". Generalizing the quaternions and octonions, Kirkman called a pluquaternion Q_{a} a representative of a system with a imaginary units, a > 3. Kirkman's paper was dedicated to confirming Cayley's assertions concerning two equations among triple-products of units as sufficient to determine the system in case a = 3 but not a = 4. By 1900 these number systems were called hypercomplex numbers, and later treated as part of the theory of associative algebras.

=== Polyhedral combinatorics ===
Beginning in 1853, Kirkman began working on combinatorial enumeration problems concerning polyhedra, beginning with a proof of Euler's formula and concentrating on simple polyhedra (the polyhedra in which each vertex has three incident edges). He also studied Hamiltonian cycles in polyhedra, and provided an example of a polyhedron with no Hamiltonian cycle, prior to the work of William Rowan Hamilton on the Icosian game. He enumerated cubic Halin graphs, over a century before the work of Halin on these graphs. He showed that every polyhedron can be generated from a pyramid by face-splitting and vertex-splitting operations, and he studied self-dual polyhedra.

=== Late work ===
Kirkman was inspired to work in group theory by a prize offered beginning in 1858 (but in the end never awarded) by the French Academy of Sciences. His contributions in this area include an enumeration of the transitive group actions on sets of up to ten elements. However, as with much of his work on polyhedra, Kirkman's work in this area was weighed down by newly invented terminology and, perhaps because of this, did not significantly influence later researchers.

In the early 1860s, Kirkman fell out with the mathematical establishment and in particular with Arthur Cayley and James Joseph Sylvester, over the poor reception of his works on polyhedra and groups and over issues of priority. Much of his later mathematical work was published (often in doggerel) in the problem section of the Educational Times and in the obscure Proceedings of the Literary and Philosophical Society of Liverpool. However, in 1884 he began serious work on knot theory, and with Peter Guthrie Tait published an enumeration of the knots with up to ten crossings. He remained active in mathematics even after retirement, until his death in 1895.

== Awards and honours ==
In 1852, the Rev. Thomas Penyngton Kirkman was elected as an Honorary member of the Manchester Literary and Philosophical Society, In 1857, Kirkman was elected as a fellow of the Royal Society for his research on pluquaternions and partitions. He was also an honorary member of the Literary and Philosophical Society of Manchester and the Literary and Philosophical Society of Liverpool, and a foreign member of the Dutch Society of Science.

Since 1994, the Institute of Combinatorics and its Applications has handed out an annual Kirkman medal, named after Kirkman, to recognise outstanding combinatorial research by a mathematician within four years of receiving a doctorate.
