= Louise Duffield Cummings =

American mathematician

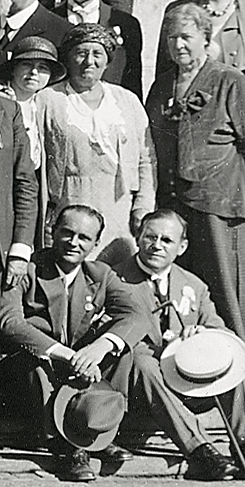
- Prof. Louise Cummings (standing right) at the ICM 1932
- Born: November 21, 1870; Hamilton, Ontario, Canada
- Died: May 9, 1947 (aged 76)
- Education: University of Toronto; Bryn Mawr College
- Scientific career
- Fields: Mathematics
- Workplaces: Vassar College
- Thesis: On a Method of Comparison for Triple-Systems (1914)
- Doctoral advisor: Charlotte Scott

Louise Duffield Cummings (21 November 1870 – 9 May 1947) was a Canadian-born American mathematician. She was born in Hamilton, Ontario.

== Education and career ==
As a young child, Louise Duffield Cummings studied at the public schools and Collegiate Institute at Hamilton.

Cummings received her B.A. in 1895 from the University of Toronto. She studied mathematics at the graduate level in 1895–1896 under the Professor DeLury at University of Toronto, in 1896–1897 at the University of Pennsylvania where she held a fellowship, in 1897–1898 at the University of Chicago, and in 1898–1900 at Bryn Mawr College. During 1900–1901 she taught at the Ontario Normal College and, while completing her A.M. at the University of Toronto, she taught at St. Margaret's College during 1901–1902. she worked with Henry White and Charlotte Scott was her supervisor. She returned to Bryn Mawr College in 1905 and 1912–1913.

Cummings joined the faculty of Vassar in 1902 as an instructor; she worked with Henry White and Charlotte Scott was her supervisor. She finally received her Ph.D. from Bryn Mawr in 1914 with a thesis "On a Method of Comparison for Triple-Systems," published in the Transactions of the American Mathematical Society, Vol 15 (July 1914) . Her major subject was Pure Mathematics, and her minors were Applied Mathematics and Physics. before her retirement in 1936. She was promoted to assistant professor in 1915, to associate professor in 1919, and to full professor in 1927. She was an invited speaker at the International Congress of Mathematicians in 1924 at Toronto and again in 1932 at Zürich.

== Selected publications ==
- Cummings, L. D. (1913). "A note on the groups for triple-systems". Bull. Amer. Math. Soc. 19 (7): 355–356. doi:10.1090/s0002-9904-1913-02369-3. MR 1559362.
- Cummings, Louise D. (1914). "On a method of comparison for triple systems". Trans. Amer. Math. Soc. 15 (3): 311–327. doi:10.1090/s0002-9947-1914-1500982-1. hdl:2027/mdp.39015068190779. MR 1500982. (Ph.D. dissertation)
- with H. S. White: Cummings, Louise D.; White, H. S. (1915). "Groupless triad systems on fifteen elements". Bull. Amer. Math. Soc. 22: 12–16. doi:10.1090/s0002-9904-1915-02710-2. MR 1559701.
- Cummings, Louise D. (1918). "An undervalued Kirkman paper". Bull. Amer. Math. Soc. 24 (7): 336–339. doi:10.1090/s0002-9904-1918-03086-3. MR 1560081.
- Cummings, Louise D. (1919). "The trains for the 36 groupless triad systems on 15 elements". Bull. Amer. Math. Soc. 25 (7): 321–324. doi:10.1090/s0002-9904-1919-03192-9. MR 1560192.
- Cummings, Louise D. (1925). "A new type of double sextette closed under a binary (3,3) correspondence". Bull. Amer. Math. Soc. 31 (5): 266–274. doi:10.1090/s0002-9904-1925-04049-5. MR 1561036.
- Cummings, Louise D. (1932). "Hexagonal systems of seven lines in a plane". Bull. Amer. Math. Soc. 38 (2): 105–110. doi:10.1090/s0002-9904-1932-05337-x. MR 1562336.
- Cummings, Louise D. (1932). "Heptagonal systems of eight lines in a plane". Bull. Amer. Math. Soc. 38 (10): 700–702. doi:10.1090/s0002-9904-1932-05502-1. MR 1562491.
- Cummings, Louise D. (1933). "On a method of comparison for straight-line nets". Bull. Amer. Math. Soc. 39 (6): 411–416. doi:10.1090/s0002-9904-1933-05649-5. MR 1562638.
