= Wesley S. B. Woolhouse =

English actuary

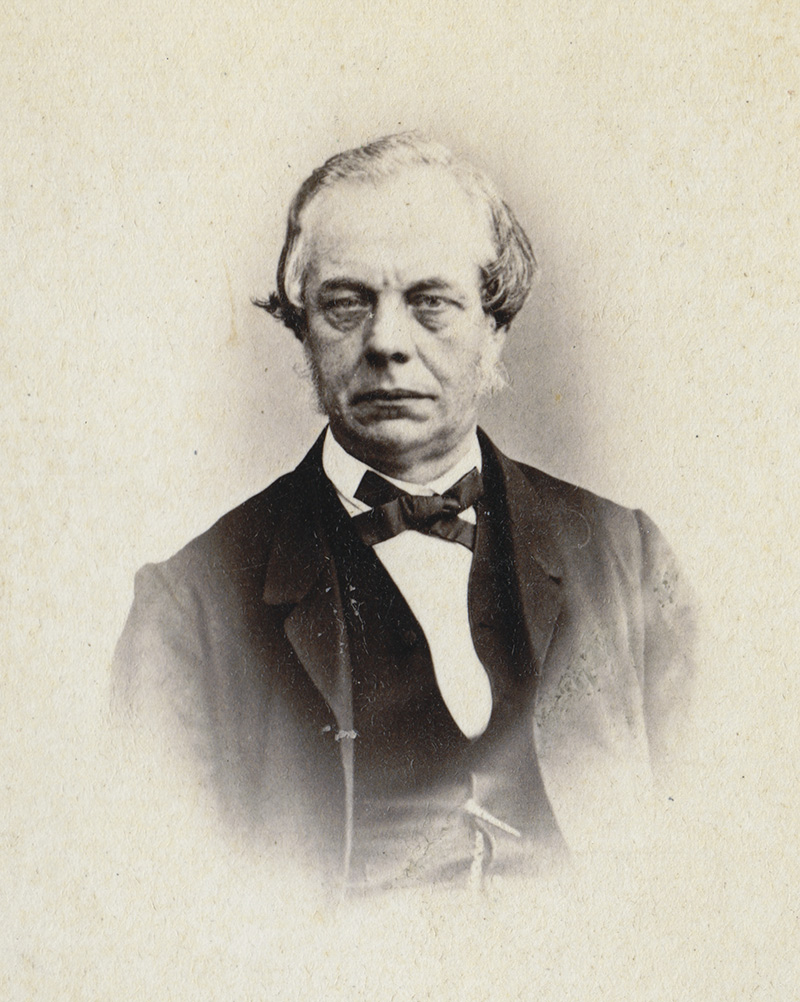
W.S.B. Woolhouse (United States Naval Observatory)

Wesley Stoker Barker Woolhouse (6 May 1809 – 12 August 1893) was an English actuary who also published books in music theory, steam locomotive design, measurements, and other fields.

== Biography ==
He was born in North Shields, England, and at the age of thirteen won a mathematical prize offered by The Ladies' Diary, competing against adults.

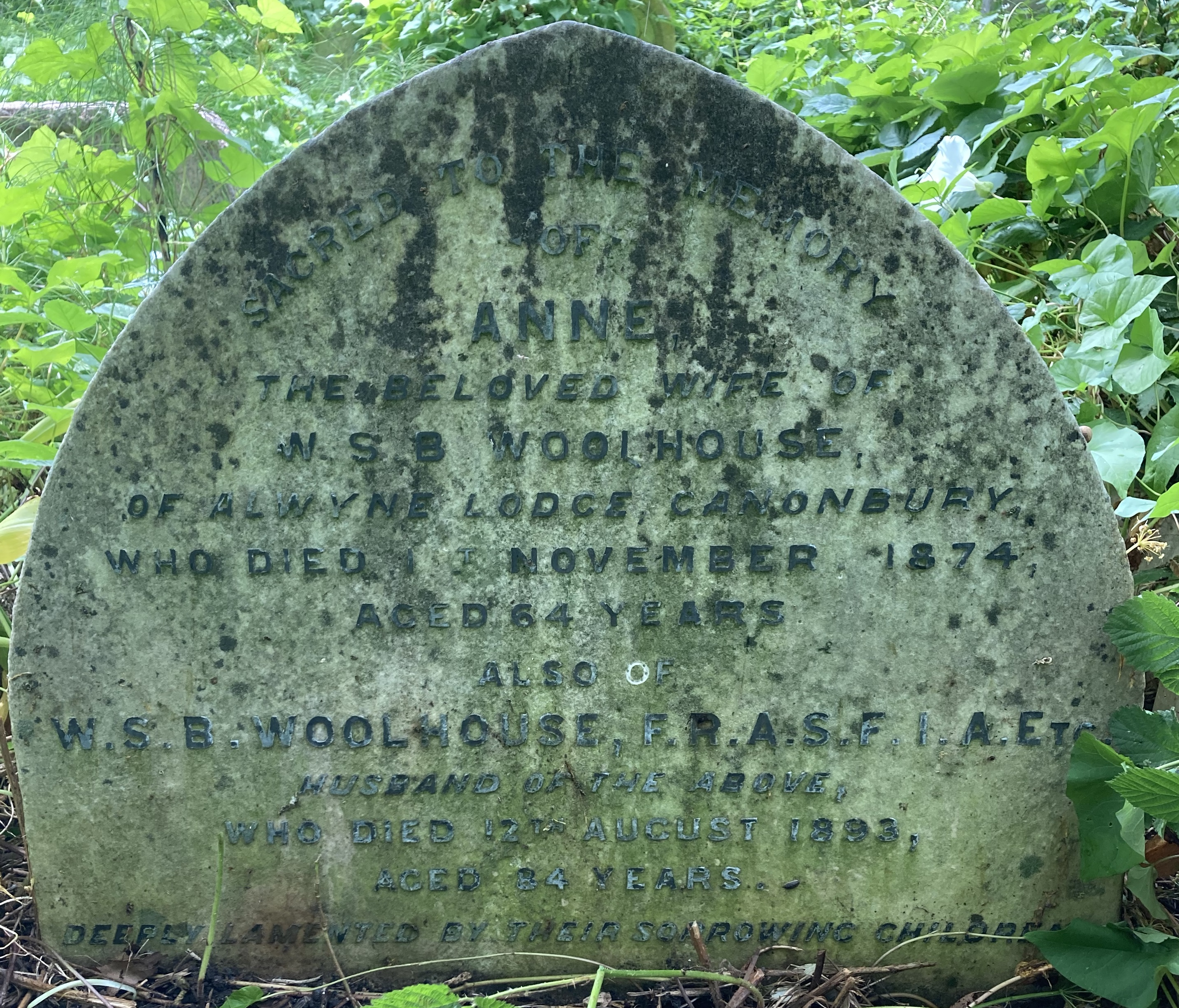
Grave of Wesley S. B. Woolhouse in Highgate Cemetery

From 1830 to 1837 he was Deputy Secretary of The Nautical Almanac. In 1844 he became editor of The Lady's and Gentleman's Diary, and continued in this role until 1865. A problem he published in The Lady's and Gentleman's Diary was the inspiration for Thomas Kirkman to publish his first mathematical work, Kirkman's schoolgirl problem, beginning the mathematical study of combinatorial designs.

His book, Essays on Musical Intervals, Harmonics, and the Temperament of the Musical Scale, advocated for 19 equal temperament and used a division of the octave into 730 parts, now designated as Woolhouse units, for measuring musical intervals.

He is credited with a formula for numerical integration. He is also credited for Woolhouse's Formula, used to estimate the present value of 1/m-thly life annuities.

In 1848 he was a co-founder of the Institute of Actuaries.

He died on 12 August 1893 and was buried in a family grave on the western side of Highgate Cemetery.

His daughter, Emma Mary Rea (nee Woolhouse), married musician William Rea of Newcastle upon Tyne, England.

== Books ==
- An Elementary Treatise on the Application of the Algebraic Analysis to Geometry (1831)
- Essays on Musical Intervals, Harmonics, and the Temperament of the Musical Scale (1835) (reprinted as ISBN 978-1-4304-8126-3)
- Investigation of Mortality in the Indian Army, (1839)
- Elements of the Differential Calculus (1852)
- The Measures, Weights and Moneys of All Nations: and an Analysis of the Christian, Hebrew And Mahometan Calendars (1856) (reprinted as ISBN 978-0-548-36669-1)
- On Interpolation, Summation, and the Adjustment of Numerical Tables, (1865)
