= PG(3,2) =

Smallest 3D projective space

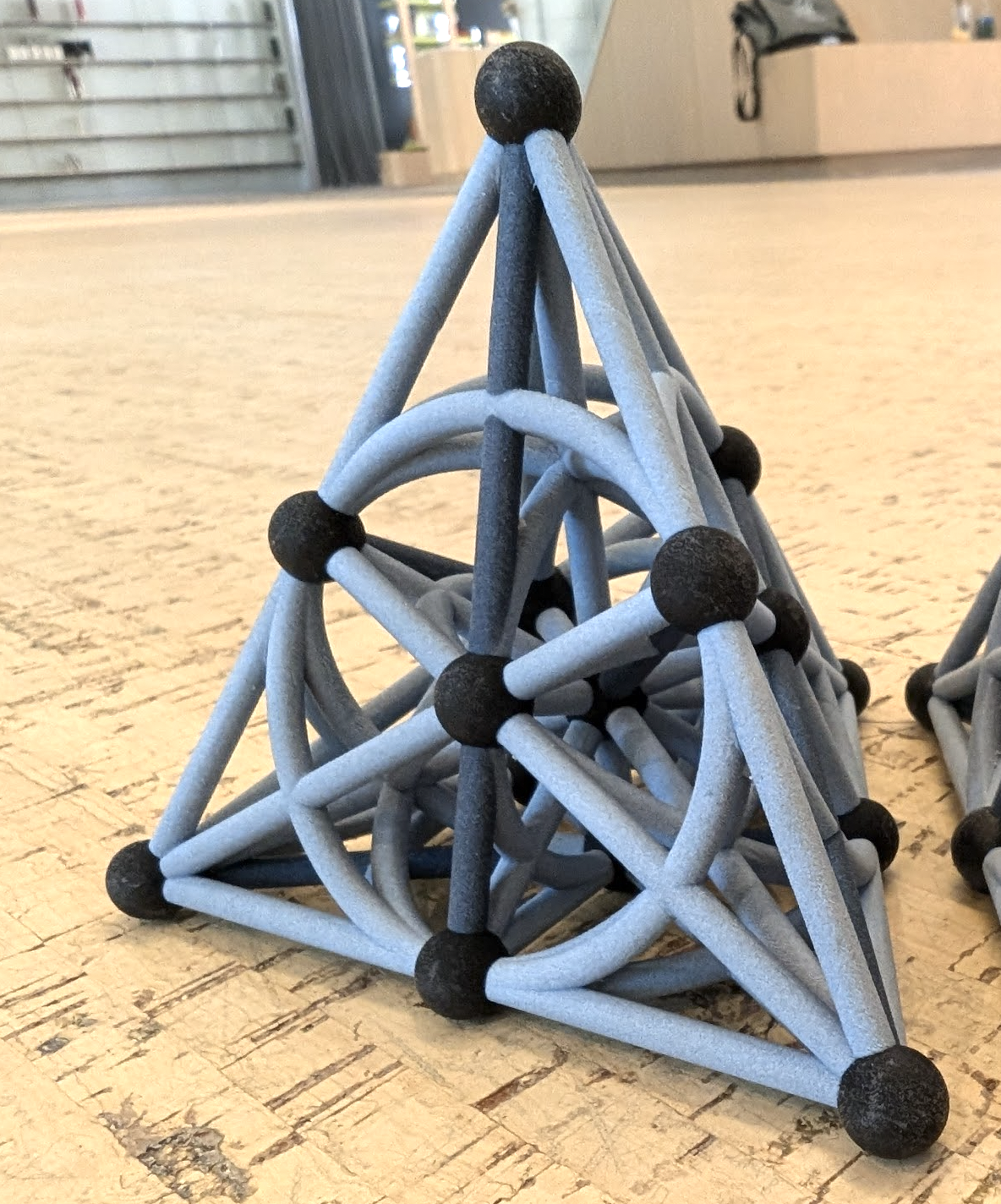
A complete 3D printed model of PG(3,2) as a tetrahedron. (see § Tetrahedral depiction)

In finite geometry, PG(3, 2) is the smallest three-dimensional projective space. It can be thought of as an extension of the Fano plane, PG(2, 2).

== Elements ==
It has 15 points, 35 lines, and 15 planes. Each point is contained in 7 lines and 7 planes. Each line is contained in 3 planes and contains 3 points. Each plane contains 7 points and 7 lines.

These can be summarized in a rank 3 configuration matrix counting points, lines, and planes on the diagonal. The incidences are expressed off diagonal. The structure is self dual, swapping points and planes, expressed by rotating the configuration matrix 180 degrees.

$$\left [\begin{matrix}15&7&7\\3&35&3\\7&7&15\end{matrix}\right ]$$

It has the following properties:

- Each plane is isomorphic to the Fano plane.
- Every pair of distinct planes intersects in a line.
- A line and a plane not containing the line intersect in exactly one point.

PG(3, 2) has 20160 automorphisms. The number of automorphisms is given by finding the number of ways of selecting 4 points that are not coplanar; this works out to (2^{4}-1)(2^{4}-2)(2^{4}-2^{2})(2^{4}-2^{3})/(2-1) = 15⋅14⋅12⋅8.

The 15 planes can be generated by a block design difference set (0,1,2,4,5,8,10). The 35 lines can be generated by pairwise plane point intersections, each containing 3 points.

=== Related affine spaces ===
If one plane is removed (and its 7 points and 7 lines), we create the affine space AG(3,2), composed of 7 sets of 2 parallel planes (each K_{4} graphs). The 8 points and 28 lines alone make a complete graph K_{8} graph. It has 20160/15 = 1344 automorphisms.

$$\left [\begin{matrix}8&7&7\\2&28&3\\4&6&14\end{matrix}\right ]$$

Removing one point (and its 7 lines and 7 planes) further creates a smaller self dual rank 3 configuration of 7 points, 21 lines and 7 K_{4} graph planes. Automorphisms reduce to 168 (1344/8).

$$\left [\begin{matrix}7&6&4\\2&21&2\\4&6&7\end{matrix}\right ]$$

This design is 7_{4}, and also set complement to fano plane, 7_{3}. Since 7_{3} has difference set (1,2,4), 7_{4} planes are the complement set (0,3,5,6). The 21 lines contain 2 points as pairwise intersections of the planes.

== Constructions ==
=== Construction from K_{6} ===
Take a complete graph K_{6}. It has 15 edges, 15 perfect matchings and 20 triangles. Create a point for each of the 15 edges, and a line for each of the 20 triangles and 15 matchings. The incidence structure between each triangle or matching (line) and its three constituent edges (points) induces a PG(3, 2).

=== Construction from Fano planes ===
Take a Fano plane and apply all 5040 permutations of its 7 points. Discard duplicate planes to obtain a set of 30 distinct Fano planes. Pick any of the 30, and pick the 14 others that have exactly one line in common with the first, not 0 or 3. The incidence structure between the 1 + 14 = 15 Fano planes and the 35 triplets they mutually cover induces a PG(3, 2).

== Representations ==
=== Tetrahedral depiction ===
PG(3,2) points and "lines" in a tetrahedron. It has 15 red vertices: 4 corners (v), 6 mid-edge (e), 4 mid-face (f), and 1 central (c). It has 35 "lines" colored by positions: 6 vve (green), 12 vef (blue), 4 eee (red circles), 4 vfc (magenta), 3 eec (yellow), 6 eff (cyan elipses).

PG(3, 2) can be represented as a tetrahedron. The 15 points correspond to the 4 vertices + 6 edge-midpoints + 4 face-centers + 1 body-center. The 35 lines correspond to the 6 edges + 12 face-medians + 4 face-incircles + 4 altitudes from a face to the opposite vertex + 3 lines connecting the midpoints of opposite edges + 6 ellipses connecting each edge midpoint with its two non-neighboring face centers. The 15 planes consist of the 4 faces + the 6 "medial" planes connecting each edge to the midpoint of the opposite edge + 4 "cones" connecting each vertex to the incircle of the opposite face + one "sphere" with the 6 edge centers and the body center. This was described by Burkard Polster. The tetrahedral depiction has the same structure as the visual representation of the multiplication table for the sedenions.

Numbering the points 0...14 (4 (v)ertices, 6 mid-(e)dges, 4 mid-(f)aces, and 1 (c)entral), the 15 planes and 35 lines of the configuration can be grouped by symmetry positions in the tetrahedron:

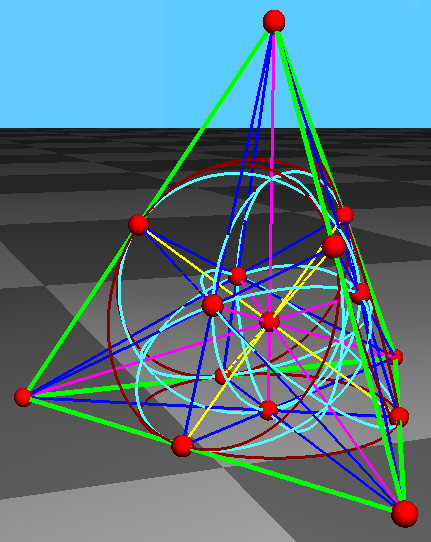
Another depiction of PG(3, 2) as a tetrahedron

Point-Plane configuration (15_{7} 15_{7})
4 v^{3}e^{3}f				6 v^{2}e^{2}f^{2}c						4 ve^{3}f^{3}				1 e^{6}c
0	0	0	1	0	0	0	1	1	2	0	1	2	3	4
1	1	2	2	1	2	3	2	3	3	7	5	4	4	5
2	3	3	3	4	5	6	7	8	9	8	6	6	5	6
4	4	5	7	9	8	7	6	8	4	9	9	8	7	7
5	6	6	8	12	11	10	11	10	10	10	10	10	11	8
7	8	9	9	13	13	13	12	12	11	11	13	12	12	9
10	11	12	13	14	14	14	14	14	14	12	13	13	13	14

Point-Line configuration (15_{7} 35_{3})
6 v^{2}e						12 vef												4 e^{3}				4 vfc				3 e^{2}c			6 ef^{2}					
0	0	0	1	1	2	0	0	0	1	1	1	2	2	2	3	3	3	4	4	5	7	0	1	2	3	4	5	6	4	5	6	7	8	9
1	2	3	2	3	3	7	8	9	5	6	9	4	6	8	4	5	7	5	6	6	8	13	12	11	10	9	8	7	12	11	10	11	10	10
4	5	6	7	8	9	10	11	12	10	11	13	10	12	13	11	12	13	7	8	9	9	14	14	14	14	14	14	14	13	13	13	12	12	11

=== Square representation ===
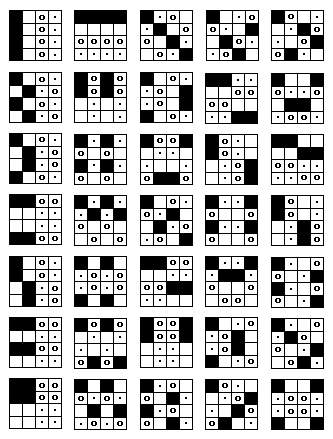
Square model of Fano 3-space

PG(3, 2) can be represented as a square. The 15 points are assigned 4-bit binary coordinates from 0001 to 1111, augmented with a point labeled 0000, and arranged in a 4×4 grid. Lines correspond to the equivalence classes of sets of four vertices that XOR together to 0000. With certain arrangements of the vertices in the 4×4 grid, such as the "natural" row-major ordering or the Karnaugh map ordering, the lines form symmetric sub-structures like rows, columns, transversals, or rectangles, as seen in the figure. (There are 20160 such orderings, as seen below in the section on Automorphisms.) This representation is possible because geometrically the 35 lines are represented as a bijection with the 35 ways to partition a 4×4 affine space into 4 parallel planes of 4 cells each. This was described by Steven H. Cullinane.

=== Sedenion representation ===
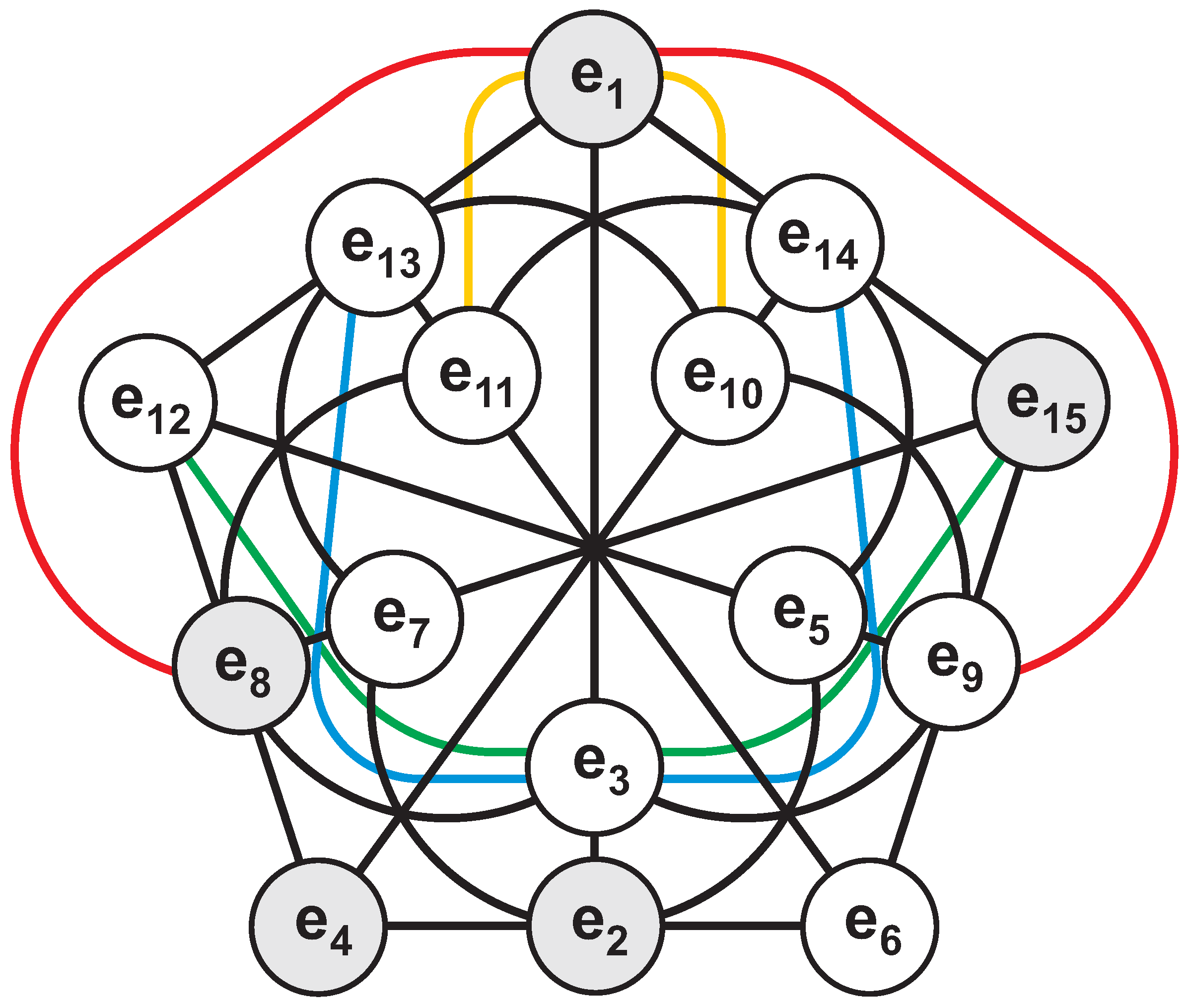
An illustration of the structure of PG(3,2) that provides the multiplication law for sedenions, as shown by Saniga, Holweck & Pracna (2015). Any three points (representing three sedenion imaginary units) lying on the same line are such that the product of two of them yields the third one, sign disregarded.

=== Doily depiction ===
The Doily. This is also a representation of the strongly regular graph srg(15,6,1,3) drawn with overlapping edges.

The Doily diagram often used to represent the generalized quadrangle GQ(2, 2) is also used to represent PG(3, 2). This was described by Richard Doily.

== Kirkman's schoolgirl problem ==
PG(3, 2) arises as a background in some solutions of Kirkman's schoolgirl problem. Two of the seven non-isomorphic solutions to this problem can be embedded as structures in the Fano 3-space. In particular, a spread of PG(3, 2) is a partition of points into disjoint lines, and corresponds to the arrangement of girls (points) into disjoint rows (lines of a spread) for a single day of Kirkman's schoolgirl problem. There are 56 different spreads of 5 lines each. A packing of PG(3, 2) is a partition of the 35 lines into 7 disjoint spreads of 5 lines each, and corresponds to a solution for all seven days. There are 240 packings of PG(3, 2), that fall into two conjugacy classes of 120 under the action of PGL(4, 2) (the collineation group of the space); a correlation interchanges these two classes.

== Coordinates ==
It is known that a PG(n, 2) can be coordinatized with (GF(2))^{n+1}, i.e. a bit string of length n + 1. PG(3, 2) can therefore be coordinatized with 4-bit strings.

In addition, the line joining points (a_{1}, a_{2}, a_{3}, a_{4}) and (b_{1}, b_{2}, b_{3}, b_{4}) can be naturally assigned Plücker coordinates (p_{12}, p_{13}, p_{14}, p_{23}, p_{24}, p_{34}) where p_{ij} = a_{i}b_{j} − a_{j}b_{i}, and the line coordinates satisfy p_{12} p_{34} + p_{13} p_{24} + p_{14} p_{23} = 0. Each line in projective 3-space thus has six coordinates, and can be represented as a point in projective 5-space; the points lie on the surface p_{12} p_{34} + p_{13} p_{24} + p_{14} p_{23} = 0.
