= Acta Mathematica Sinica =

- Discipline: Mathematics
- Language: English
- Edited by: Fanghua Lin, Gang Tian

Publication details
- History: 1985–present
- Publisher: Springer
- Frequency: Monthly
- Impact factor: 0.833 (2021)

Standard abbreviations
- ISO 4: Acta Math. Sin.

Indexing
- ISSN: 1439-8516 (print); 1439-7617 (web)
- LCCN: 2006203026
- OCLC no.: 75491221

Links
- Journal homepage

Acta Mathematica Sinica (English series) is a peer-reviewed mathematics journal published quarterly by Springer. Founded in 1936 and split into a Chinese series and an English series in 1985, the journal publishes articles on all areas of mathematics, and allows submissions from researchers of all nationalities. The journal is indexed by Mathematical Reviews and Zentralblatt MATH. Its 2009 MCQ was 0.42, and its 2021 impact factor was 0.833.

== Abstracting and indexing ==
This journal is indexed by the following services:

- Chinese Science Citation Database
- Mathematical Reviews
- Science Citation Index
- Scopus
- Zentralblatt Math
- Referativnyi Zhurnal (VINITI)
