= Combinatorics of Finite Geometries =

Geometry textbook

- Title page for Combinatorics of finite geometries (1986)
- Author: Lynn Batten
- Language: English
- Genre: Mathematics
- Publisher: Cambridge University Press
- Publication date: 1986

Combinatorics of Finite Geometries is an undergraduate mathematics textbook on finite geometry by Lynn Batten. It was published by Cambridge University Press in 1986 with a second edition in 1997 (ISBN 0-521-59014-0).

== Topics ==
The types of finite geometry covered by the book include partial linear spaces, linear spaces, affine spaces and affine planes, projective spaces and projective planes, polar spaces, generalized quadrangles, and partial geometries. A central connecting concept is the "connection number" of a point and a line not containing it, equal to the number of lines that meet the given point and intersect the given line. The second edition adds a final chapter on blocking sets.

Beyond the basic theorems and proofs of this subject, the book includes many examples and exercises, and some history and information about current research.

== Audience and reception ==
The book is aimed at advanced undergraduates, assuming only an introductory-level of abstract algebra and some knowledge of linear algebra. Its coverage of recent research also makes it useful as background reading for researchers in this area.

Reviewer Michael J. Kallaher cites as a "serious shortcoming" of the first edition its lack of coverage of applications of this subject, for instance to the design of experiments and to coding theory. The second edition has a section on applications but reviewer Tamás Szőnyi writes that it needs additional expansion.

Because of the many types of geometry covered in the book, the coverage of each of them is, at times, shallow; for instance, reviewer Theodore G. Ostrom complains that there is only half a page on non-Desarguesian planes. Additionally, Kallaher feels that block designs should have been included in place of some of the more esoteric geometries described by Batten. Reviewer Thomas Brylawski criticizes the book for "glossing over or ignoring" important results, for overcomplicated proofs, and for missed cases in some of its case analysis.

On the other hand, reviewer B. J. Wilson "enjoyed reading this book" and praises it for its "easily followed style", while reviewer R. J. M. Dawson writes that the book "succeeds admirably" in conveying to students "the living, active nature" of this area.

== Related books ==
Other books on related topics include Finite Generalized Quadrangles by S. E. Payne and J. A. Thas, and Projective Planes by D. R. Hughes and F. C. Piper.
