= Near polygon =

Concept in incidence geometry

A dense near polygon with diameter d = 2

In mathematics, a near polygon is a concept in incidence geometry introduced by Ernest E. Shult and Arthur Yanushka in 1980. Shult and Yanushka showed the connection between the so-called tetrahedrally closed line-systems in Euclidean spaces and a class of point-line geometries which they called near polygons. These structures generalise the notion of generalized polygon as every generalized 2n-gon is a near 2n-gon of a particular kind. Near polygons were extensively studied and connection between them and dual polar spaces was shown in 1980s and early 1990s. Some sporadic simple groups, for example the Hall-Janko group and the Mathieu groups, act as automorphism groups of near polygons.

== Definition ==
A near 2d-gon is an incidence structure ($P,L,I$), where $P$ is the set of points, $L$ is the set of lines and $I\subseteq P\times L$ is the incidence relation, such that:

- The maximum distance between two points (the so-called diameter) is d.
- For every point $x$ and every line $L$ there exists a unique point on $L$ which is nearest to $x$.

Note that the distance are measured in the collinearity graph of points, i.e., the graph formed by taking points as vertices and joining a pair of vertices if they are incident with a common line. We can also give an alternate graph theoretic definition, a near 2d-gon is a connected graph of finite diameter d with the property that for every vertex x and every maximal clique M there exists a unique vertex x' in M nearest to x. The maximal cliques of such a graph correspond to the lines in the incidence structure definition. A near 0-gon (d = 0) is a single point while a near 2-gon (d = 1) is just a single line, i.e., a complete graph. A near quadrangle (d = 2) is same as a (possibly degenerate) generalized quadrangle. In fact, it can be shown that every generalized 2d-gon is a near 2d-gon that satisfies the following two additional conditions:

- Every point is incident with at least two lines.
- For every two points x, y at distance i < d, there exists a unique neighbour of y at distance i − 1 from x.

A near polygon is called dense if every line is incident with at least three points and if every two points at distance two have at least two common neighbours. It is said to have order (s, t) if every line is incident with precisely s + 1 points and every point is incident with precisely t + 1 lines. Dense near polygons have a rich theory and several classes of them (like the slim dense near polygons) have been completely classified.

== Examples ==
- All connected bipartite graphs are near polygons. In fact, any near polygon that has precisely two points per line must be a connected bipartite graph.
- All finite generalized polygons except the projective planes.
- All dual polar spaces.
- The Hall–Janko near octagon, also known as the Cohen-Tits near octagon associated with the Hall–Janko group. It can be constructed by choosing the conjugacy class of 315 central involutions of the Hall-Janko group as points and lines as three element subsets {x, y, xy} whenever x and y commute.
- The M_{24} near hexagon related to the Mathieu group M24 and the extended binary Golay code. It is constructed by taking the 759 octads (blocks) in the Witt design S(5, 8, 24) corresponding to the Golay code as points and a triple of three pairwise disjoint octads as lines.
- Take the partitions of {1, 2, ..., 2n + 2} into n + 1 2-subsets as points and the partitions into n − 1 2-subsets and one 4-subset as lines. A point is incident to a line if as a partition it is a refinement of the line. This gives us a near 2n-gon with three points on each line, usually denoted H_{n}. Its full automorphism group is the symmetric group S_{2n+2}.

== Regular near polygons ==
A finite near $2d$-gon S is called regular if it has an order $(s,t)$ and if there exist constants $t_i, i \in \{1,\ldots,d\}$, such that for every two points $x$ and $y$ at distance $i$, there are precisely $t_i + 1$ lines through $y$ containing a (necessarily unique) point at distance $i - 1$ from $x$. It turns out that regular near $2d$-gons are precisely those near $2d$-gons whose point graph (also known as a collinearity graph) is a distance-regular graph. A generalized $2d$-gon of order $(s, t)$ is a regular near $2d$-gon with parameters $t_1 = 0, t_2 = 0, \ldots, t_d = t$

== See also ==
- Finite geometry
- Polar space
- Partial linear space
- Association scheme
- Hall–Janko graph
