= Moulton plane =

The Moulton plane. Lines sloping down and to the right are bent where they cross the y-axis.

In incidence geometry, the Moulton plane is an example of an affine plane in which Desargues's theorem does not hold. It is named after the American astronomer Forest Ray Moulton. The points of the Moulton plane are simply the points in the real plane R^{2} and the lines are the regular lines as well with the exception that for lines with a negative slope, the slope doubles when they pass the y-axis.

== Formal definition ==
The Moulton plane is an incidence structure $\mathfrak M=\langle P, G,\textrm I\rangle$, where $P$ denotes the set of points, $G$ the set of lines and $\textrm I$ the incidence relation "lies on":

$$P:=\mathbb R^2 \,$$
$$G:=(\mathbb R \cup \{\infty\}) \times \mathbb R,$$

$\infty$ is just a formal symbol for an element $\not\in\mathbb R$. It is used to describe vertical lines, which you may think of as lines with an infinitely large slope.

The incidence relation is defined as follows:

For $p = (x, y) \in P$ and $g = (m, b) \in G$ we have

$$p\,\textrm I\,g\iff\begin{cases}
x=b&\text{if }m=\infty\\
y=\frac{1}{2}mx+b&\text{if }m\leq 0, x\leq 0\\
y=mx+b&\text{if }m\geq 0 \text{ or } x\geq 0.
\end{cases}$$

== Application ==
The Moulton plane is an affine plane in which Desargues' theorem does not hold. The associated projective plane is consequently non-Desarguesian as well. This means that there are projective planes not isomorphic to $PG(2,F)$ for any (skew) field F. Here $PG(2,F)$ is the projective plane $P(F^3)$ determined by a 3-dimensional vector space over the (skew) field F.
