= Jean A. Larson =

American mathematician

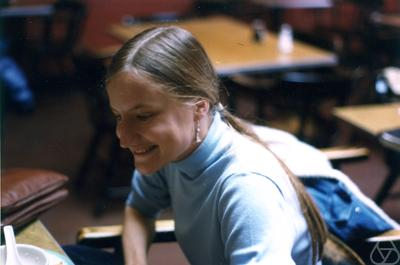

Academic background
- Education: University of California, Berkeley, Dartmouth College
- Doctoral advisor: James Earl Baumgartner
- Influences: John W. Addison Jr.

Academic work
- Discipline: Mathematics
- Sub-discipline: Set theory, infinitary combinatorics
- Institutions: University of California, Los Angeles, University of Florida

Jean Ann Larson is an American mathematician. She is a set theorist, a historian of mathematical logic, and a former professor at the University of Florida. She was the first woman to earn a doctorate in mathematics from Dartmouth College, and is known for her research in infinitary combinatorics and the theory of linear spaces.

== Career ==
Larson was raised in the San Francisco Bay Area, and graduated from the University of California, Berkeley in 1968 with a bachelor's degree in mathematics and a minor in English. As an undergraduate, she had planned to go into teaching, but a mentor at Berkeley, logician John W. Addison Jr., recognized her talent for mathematics and encouraged her to go on to graduate study. She earned her Ph.D. under the supervision of James Earl Baumgartner at Dartmouth College in 1972, becoming the first woman to obtain a mathematics PhD there.

Larson became an E. R. Hedrick Assistant Professor at the University of California, Los Angeles from 1972 to 1974. She has been affiliated with the University of Florida since 1974, where she was promoted to full professor in 1987 and served as Associate Chair for Graduate Studies from 1993 to 1996. In 2002 Larson became chair of the faculty senate at the University of Florida. She credits her Quaker religious practice for making her a good listener and a "consensus builder", two qualities she sees as important in campus leadership.

== Research ==
Much of Larson's research is in infinitary combinatorics, studying versions of Ramsey's theorem for infinite sets. Her doctoral dissertation, On Some Arrow Relations, was in this subject. She has been called a "prominent figure in the field of partition relations", particularly for her "expertise in relations for countable ordinals". Five of her publications are with Paul Erdős, who became her most frequent collaborator. Erdős, another prominent combinatorialist, visited Larson and others at the University of Florida for two weeks per year every year from 1973 to 1996.

In the theory of linear spaces, the Drake–Larson linear spaces are named after Larson and her co-author and University of Florida colleague David A. Drake. These are linear spaces (finite systems of points and lines, with at least two points on every line, a line through every two points, and not all points on a single line) such that none of the lines have exactly two, three, or six points. When such a space exists, it can be used to construct certain kinds of Latin squares. In a 1983 paper, Drake and Larson determined the possible numbers of points in these spaces, with one exception, the spaces with exactly thirty points. This case was an open problem for many years, until it was resolved in 2010 by Betten and Betten.
