= Lynn Batten =

Canadian mathematician

Lynn Margaret Batten (1948 – 28 July 2022) was a Canadian-Australian mathematician known for her books about finite geometry and cryptography, and for her research on the classification of malware.

== Education and career ==
Batten earned her Ph.D. at the University of Waterloo in 1977. Her dissertation was D-Partition Geometries.

Formerly the Associate Dean for Academic and Industrial Research at the University of Manitoba, she moved to Deakin University, Australia in 2000, where she held the Deakin Chair in Mathematics, and directed the Information Security Group.

She was involved in the founding of the Australian Mathematical Sciences Institute (AMSI) from 2001.

== Books ==
- Combinatorics of Finite Geometries. Cambridge; New York: Cambridge University Press. 31 March 1986. ISBN 978-0-521-31857-0.
- With Albrecht Beutelspacher: The Theory of Finite Linear Spaces. Cambridge: Cambridge University Press. 9 April 2009. ISBN 978-0-521-11418-9.
- Public Key Cryptography. Hoboken, N.J: John Wiley & Sons. 22 January 2013. ISBN 978-1-118-31712-9.
