= Dobble =

Card game

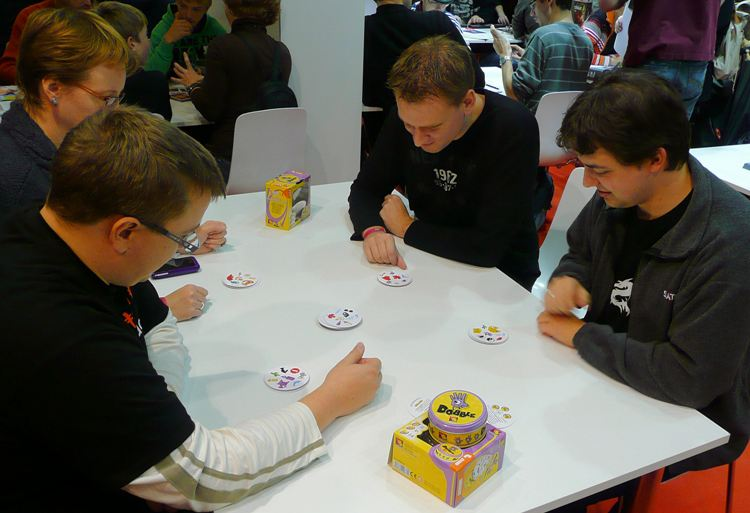

- Alternative names: Spot It!
- Type: Matching
- Players: 2-8
- Age range: 8+
- Cards: 55
- Deck: Proprietary cards
- Playing time: 15 minutes

Dobble is a game in which players have to find symbols in common between two cards. It was the UK’s best-selling game in 2018 and 2019.

The game is sold as Dobble in Europe and Spot It! in the US. The name is a play on the word 'double'.

== Gameplay ==
The game is played with a deck of 55 cards, each featuring eight different symbols. Any two cards share exactly one matching symbol. The objective is to be the first player to identify and announce the common symbol between two cards.

== Development ==
In 1976, inspired by Kirkman's schoolgirl problem, French mathematics enthusiast Jacques Cottereau devised a game consisting of a set of 31 cards each with six images of insects, with exactly one image shared between each pair of them. In 2008, journalist and game designer Denis Blanchot found a few of the cards from the "game of insects" and developed the idea to create Dobble.

Dobble was released in France in 2009, and in the UK and North America in 2011 under Blue Orange Games. In 2015, the French board game company Asmodee acquired the rights to Dobble and Spot It!

== Mathematics ==
2 points on each line, 2 lines on each point

The Fano Plane

The special way that symbols are arranged on Dobble cards can be understood using geometry. If each card is represented by a line, and each symbol by a point where two lines intersect, then the properties of Dobble are that:

- any two lines intersect at exactly one point, and
- any two points are joined by exactly one line.

This geometric structure is an example of a finite projective plane.

Simpler version with 7 cards (discs) each with 3 out of 7 symbols (colors)

If there are 3 points in each line this creates a structure known as the Fano plane. This represents a simpler version of Dobble with 3 symbols on each card, 7 cards and 7 symbols.

In general, a finite projective plane of order n−1 has n points on each line, and n^{2}−n+1 points and lines.

Graph of the projective plane of order 7, having 57 points, 57 lines, 8 points on each line and 8 lines passing through each point, where each point is denoted by a rounded rectangle and each line by a combination of letter and number. Only lines with letter A and H are drawn. In the Dobble or Spot It! game, two points are removed. In the SVG file, hover over a line to highlight it.

The game of Dobble with 8 symbols on each card corresponds to the finite projective plane of order 7, where each line joins 8 points. This results in a structure with 57 lines and 57 points (8^{2}−8+1=57), corresponding to a maximum of 57 cards and 57 symbols. Dobble uses 55 cards rather than 57, allegedly to allow the cards to be printed on card-making machines designed for standard playing card decks (52 plus 2 jokers and 1 advertising card). A junior version of Dobble features 6 symbols per card, 30 cards, and 31 different symbols (6^{2}−6+1=31).
