= Affine plane =

Two-dimensional geometrical space

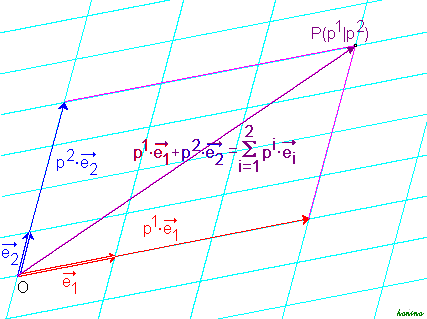
An affine coordinate system on a plane, defined by axes e_{1} and e_{2}.

In geometry, an affine plane is a two-dimensional affine space.

== Definitions ==
There are two ways to formally define affine planes, which are equivalent for affine planes over a field.

The first way consists in defining an affine plane as a set on which a vector space of dimension two acts simply transitively. Intuitively, this means that an affine plane is a vector space of dimension two in which one has "forgotten" where the origin is.

The second way occurs in incidence geometry, where an affine plane is defined as an abstract system of points and lines satisfying a system of axioms.

== Coordinates and isomorphism ==
All the affine planes defined over a field are isomorphic. More precisely, the choice of an affine coordinate system (or, in the real case, a Cartesian coordinate system) for an affine plane $P$ over a field $F$ induces an isomorphism of affine planes between $P$ and $F^2$.

In the more general situation, where the affine planes are not defined over a field, they will in general not be isomorphic. Two affine planes arising from the same non-Desarguesian projective plane by the removal of different lines may not be isomorphic.

== Examples ==
Typical examples of affine planes are

- Euclidean planes, which are affine planes over the reals equipped with a metric, the Euclidean distance. In other words, an affine plane over the reals is a Euclidean plane in which one has "forgotten" the metric (that is, one does not talk of lengths nor of angle measures).
- Vector spaces of dimension two, in which the zero vector is not considered as different from the other elements.
- For every field or division ring $F$, the set $F^2$ of the pairs of elements of $F$.
- The result of removing any single line (and all the points on this line) from any projective plane.

== Applications ==
In the applications of mathematics, there are often situations where an affine plane without the Euclidean metric is used instead of the Euclidean plane. For example, in a graph, which can be drawn on paper, and in which the position of a particle is plotted against time, the Euclidean metric is not adequate for its interpretation, since the distances between its points or the measures of the angles between its lines have, in general, no physical importance (in the affine plane the axes can use different units, which are not comparable, and the measures also vary with different units and scales (Note: See also the books of Mandelbrot, "Gaussian Self-Affinity and Fractals", of Levi, "Foundations of Geometry and Trigonometry", and of Yaglom, "A Simple Non-Euclidean Geometry and its Physical Basis".)).

== Sources ==
- Artin, Emil (1987), "II. Affine and Projective Geometry", Geometric Algebra, Interscience Publishers, ISBN 0-470-03432-7
- Blumenthal, Leonard M. (1980) [1961], "IV. Coordinates in an Affine Plane", A Modern View of Geometry, Dover, ISBN 0-486-63962-2
- Gruenberg, K.W.; Weir, A.J. (1977), "II. Affine and Projective Geometry", Linear Geometry (2nd ed.), Springer-Verlag, ISBN 0-387-90227-9
- Snapper, Ernst; Troyer, Robert J. (1989) [1971], Metric Affine Geometry, Dover, ISBN 0-486-66108-3
- Yale, Paul B. (1968), "Chapter 5 Affine Spaces", Geometry and Symmetry, Holden-Day
