= Linear space (geometry) =

Type of incidence structure

A linear space is a basic structure in incidence geometry. A linear space consists of a set of elements called points, and a set of elements called lines. Each line is a distinct subset of the points. The points in a line are said to be incident with the line. Each two points are in a line, and any two lines may have no more than one point in common. Intuitively, this rule can be visualized as the property that two straight lines never intersect more than once.

Linear spaces can be seen as a generalization of projective and affine planes, and more broadly, of 2-$(v,k,1)$ block designs, where the requirement that every block contains the same number of points is dropped and the essential structural characteristic is that 2 points are incident with exactly 1 line.

The term linear space was coined by Paul Libois in 1964, though many results about linear spaces are much older.

== Definition ==
Let L = (P, G, I) be an incidence structure, for which the elements of P are called points and the elements of G are called lines. L is a linear space if the following three axioms hold:

- (L1) two distinct points are incident with exactly one line.
- (L2) every line is incident to at least two distinct points.
- (L3) L contains at least two distinct lines.

Some authors drop (L3) when defining linear spaces. In such a situation the linear spaces complying to (L3) are considered as nontrivial and those that do not are trivial.

== Examples ==
The regular Euclidean plane with its points and lines constitutes a linear space, moreover all affine and projective spaces are linear spaces as well.

The table below shows all possible nontrivial linear spaces of five points. Because any two points are always incident with one line, the lines being incident with only two points are not drawn, by convention. The trivial case is simply a line through five points.

In the first illustration, the ten lines connecting the ten pairs of points are not drawn. In the second illustration, seven lines connecting seven pairs of points are not drawn.

| 10 lines | 8 lines | 6 lines | 5 lines |

A linear space of n points containing a line being incident with n − 1 points is called a near pencil. (See pencil)

near pencil with 10 points

== Properties ==
The De Bruijn–Erdős theorem shows that in any finite linear space $S=({\mathcal P},{\mathcal L}, \textbf{I})$ which is not a single point or a single line, we have $|\mathcal{P}| \leq |\mathcal{L}|$.

== See also ==
- Block design
- Fano plane
- Projective space
- Affine space
- Molecular geometry
- Partial linear space
