= Partial geometry =

Type of incidence structure

An incidence structure $C=(P,L,I)$ consists of a set $P$ of points, a set $L$ of lines, and an incidence relation, or set of flags, $I \subseteq P \times L$; a point $p$ is said to be incident with a line $l$ if $(p,l) \in I$. It is a (finite) partial geometry if there are integers $s,t,\alpha\geq 1$ such that:

- For any pair of distinct points $p$ and $q$, there is at most one line incident with both of them.
- Each line is incident with $s+1$ points.
- Each point is incident with $t+1$ lines.
- If a point $p$ and a line $l$ are not incident, there are exactly $\alpha$ pairs $(q,m)\in I$, such that $p$ is incident with $m$ and $q$ is incident with $l$.

A partial geometry with these parameters is denoted by $\mathrm{pg}(s,t,\alpha)$.

== Properties ==
- The number of points is given by $\frac{(s+1)(s t+\alpha)}{\alpha}$ and the number of lines by $\frac{(t+1)(s t+\alpha)}{\alpha}$.
- The point graph (also known as the collinearity graph) of a $\mathrm{pg}(s,t,\alpha)$ is a strongly regular graph: $\mathrm{srg}\Big((s+1)\frac{(s t+\alpha)}{\alpha},s(t+1),s-1+t(\alpha-1),\alpha(t+1)\Big)$.
- Partial geometries are dualizable structures: the dual of a $\mathrm{pg}(s,t,\alpha)$ is simply a $\mathrm{pg}(t,s,\alpha)$.

== Special cases ==
- The generalized quadrangles are exactly those partial geometries $\mathrm{pg}(s,t,\alpha)$ with $\alpha=1$.
- The Steiner systems $S(2, s+1, ts+1)$ are precisely those partial geometries $\mathrm{pg}(s,t,\alpha)$ with $\alpha=s+1$.

== Generalisations ==
A partial linear space $S=(P,L,I)$ of order $s, t$ is called a semipartial geometry if there are integers $\alpha\geq 1, \mu$ such that:

- If a point $p$ and a line $l$ are not incident, there are either $0$ or exactly $\alpha$ pairs $(q,m)\in I$, such that $p$ is incident with $m$ and $q$ is incident with $l$.
- Every pair of non-collinear points have exactly $\mu$ common neighbours.

A semipartial geometry is a partial geometry if and only if $\mu = \alpha(t+1)$.

It can be easily shown that the collinearity graph of such a geometry is strongly regular with parameters $(1 + s(t + 1) + s(t+1)t(s - \alpha + 1)/\mu, s(t+1), s - 1 + t(\alpha - 1), \mu)$.

A nice example of such a geometry is obtained by taking the affine points of $\mathrm{PG}(3, q^2)$ and only those lines that intersect the plane at infinity in a point of a fixed Baer subplane; it has parameters $(s, t, \alpha, \mu) = (q^2 - 1, q^2 + q, q, q(q + 1))$.

== See also ==
- Strongly regular graph
- Maximal arc
