= Partial linear space =

Type of incidence structure

A partial linear space (also semilinear or near-linear space) is a basic incidence structure in the field of incidence geometry, that carries slightly less structure than a linear space. The notion is equivalent to that of a linear hypergraph.

== Definition ==
Let $S=({\mathcal P},{\mathcal L}, \textbf{I})$ an incidence structure, for which the elements of ${\mathcal P}$ are called points and the elements of ${\mathcal L}$ are called lines. S is a partial linear space, if the following axioms hold:

- any line is incident with at least two points
- any pair of distinct points is incident with at most one line

If there is a unique line incident with every pair of distinct points, then we get a linear space.

== Properties ==
The De Bruijn–Erdős theorem shows that in any finite linear space $S=({\mathcal P},{\mathcal L}, \textbf{I})$ which is not a single point or a single line, we have $|\mathcal{P}| \leq |\mathcal{L}|$.

== Examples ==
- Projective space
- Affine space
- Polar space
- Generalized quadrangle
- Generalized polygon
- Near polygon
