= Generalized quadrangle =

Type of incidence structure

GQ(2,2), the Doily

In geometry, a generalized quadrangle is an incidence structure whose main feature is the lack of any (non-degenerate) triangles yet containing many quadrangles. A generalized quadrangle is by definition a polar space of rank two. They are the generalized n-gons with n = 4 and near 2n-gons with n = 2. They are also precisely the partial geometries pg(s,t,α) with α = 1.

== Definition ==
A generalized quadrangle is an incidence structure (P,B,I), with I ⊆ P × B an incidence relation, satisfying certain axioms. Elements of P are by definition the points of the generalized quadrangle, elements of B the lines. The axioms are the following:

- There is an s (s ≥ 1) such that on every line there are exactly s + 1 points. There is at most one point on two distinct lines.
- There is a t (t ≥ 1) such that through every point there are exactly t + 1 lines. There is at most one line through two distinct points.
- For every point p not on a line L, there is a unique line M and a unique point q, such that p is on M, and q on M and L.

(s,t) are the parameters of the generalized quadrangle. The parameters are allowed to be infinite. If either s or t is one, the generalized quadrangle is called trivial. For example, the 3x3 grid with P = {1,2,3,4,5,6,7,8,9} and B = {123, 456, 789, 147, 258, 369} is a trivial GQ with s = 2 and t = 1. A generalized quadrangle with parameters (s,t) is often denoted by GQ(s,t).

The smallest non-trivial generalized quadrangle is GQ(2,2), whose representation was dubbed "the doily" by Stanley Payne in 1973.

== Properties ==
- $|P|=(s t+1)(s+1)$
- $|B|=(s t+1)(t+1)$
- $(s+t)|st(s+1)(t+1)$
- $s\neq 1 \Longrightarrow t\leq s^2$
- $t\neq 1 \Longrightarrow s\leq t^2$

== Graphs ==
Line graph of generalized quadrangle GQ(2,4)

There are two interesting graphs that can be obtained from a generalized quadrangle.

- The collinearity graph having as vertices the points of a generalized quadrangle, with the collinear points connected. This graph is a strongly regular graph with parameters ((s+1)(st+1), s(t+1), s-1, t+1) where (s,t) is the order of the GQ.
- The incidence graph whose vertices are the points and lines of the generalized quadrangle and two vertices are adjacent if one is a point, the other a line and the point lies on the line. The incidence graph of a generalized quadrangle is characterized by being a connected, bipartite graph with diameter four and girth eight. Therefore, it is an example of a Cage. Incidence graphs of configurations are today generally called Levi graphs, but the original Levi graph was the incidence graph of the GQ(2,2).

== Duality ==
If (P,B,I) is a generalized quadrangle with parameters (s,t), then (B,P,I^{−1}), with I^{−1} the inverse incidence relation, is also a generalized quadrangle. This is the dual generalized quadrangle. Its parameters are (t,s). Even if s = t, the dual structure need not be isomorphic with the original structure.

== Generalized quadrangles with lines of size 3 ==
There are precisely five (possibly degenerate) generalized quadrangles where each line has three points incident with it, the quadrangle with empty line set, the quadrangle with all lines through a fixed point corresponding to the windmill graph Wd(3,n), grid of size 3x3, the GQ(2,2) quadrangle and the unique GQ(2,4). These five quadrangles corresponds to the five root systems in the ADE classes A_{n}, D_{n}, E_{6}, E_{7} and E_{8} , i.e., the simply laced root systems.

== Classical generalized quadrangles ==
When looking at the different cases for polar spaces of rank at least three, and extrapolating them to rank 2, one finds these (finite) generalized quadrangles :

- A hyperbolic quadric $Q^+(3,q)$, a parabolic quadric $Q(4,q)$ and an elliptic quadric $Q^-(5,q)$ are the only possible quadrics in projective spaces over finite fields with projective index 1. We find these parameters respectively :

$Q^+(3,q) :\ s=q,t=1$ (this is just a grid)
$$Q(4,q) :\  s=q,t=q$$
$$Q^-(5,q) :\ s=q,t=q^2$$

- A hermitian variety $H(n,q^2)$ has projective index 1 if and only if n is 3 or 4. We find :

$$H(3,q^2) :\ s=q^2,t=q$$
$$H(4,q^2) :\ s=q^2,t=q^3$$

- A symplectic polarity in $PG(2d+1,q)$ has a maximal isotropic subspace of dimension 1 if and only if $d=1$. Here, we find a generalized quadrangle $W(3,q)$, with $s=q,t=q$.

The generalized quadrangle derived from $Q(4,q)$ is always isomorphic with the dual of $W(3,q)$, and they are both self-dual and thus isomorphic to each other if and only if $q$ is even.

== Non-classical examples ==
- Let O be a hyperoval in $PG(2,q)$ with q an even prime power, and embed that projective (desarguesian) plane $\pi$ into $PG(3,q)$. Now consider the incidence structure $T_2^{*}(O)$ where the points are all points not in $\pi$, the lines are those not on $\pi$, intersecting $\pi$ in a point of O, and the incidence is the natural one. This is a (q-1,q+1)-generalized quadrangle.
- Let q be a prime power (odd or even) and consider a symplectic polarity $\theta$ in $PG(3,q)$. Choose an arbitrary point p and define $\pi=p^{\theta}$. Let the lines of our incidence structure be all absolute lines not on $\pi$ together with all lines through p which are not on $\pi$, and let the points be all points of $PG(3,q)$ except those in $\pi$. The incidence is again the natural one. We obtain once again a (q-1,q+1)-generalized quadrangle

== Restrictions on parameters ==
By using grids and dual grids, any integer z, z ≥ 1 allows generalized quadrangles with parameters (1,z) and (z,1). Apart from that, only the following parameters have been found possible until now, with q an arbitrary prime power :

$$(q,q)$$
$(q,q^2)$ and $(q^2,q)$
$(q^2,q^3)$ and $(q^3,q^2)$
$(q-1,q+1)$ and $(q+1,q-1)$
