= Fano plane =

Geometry with 7 points and 7 lines

- Order: 2
- Lenz–Barlotti class: VII.2
- Automorphisms: 2^{3}×3×7 = 168; PGL(3, 2)
- Point orbit lengths: 7
- Line orbit lengths: 7
- Properties: Desarguesian; Self-dual

The Fano plane

In finite geometry, the Fano plane (named after Gino Fano) is a finite projective plane with the smallest possible number of points and lines: 7 points and 7 lines, with 3 points on every line and 3 lines through every point. These points and lines cannot exist with this pattern of incidences in Euclidean geometry, but they can be given coordinates using the finite field with two elements, GF(2). The standard notation for this plane, as a member of a family of projective spaces, is PG(2, 2). Here, PG stands for "projective geometry", the first parameter is the geometric dimension (it is a plane, of dimension 2) and the second parameter is the order (the number of points per line, minus one).

The Fano plane is an example of a finite incidence structure, so many of its properties can be established using combinatorial techniques and other tools used in the study of incidence geometries. Since it is a projective space, algebraic techniques can also be effective tools in its study.

In a separate usage, a Fano plane is a projective plane that never satisfies Fano's axiom; in other words, the diagonal points of a complete quadrangle are always collinear. "The" Fano plane of 7 points and lines is "a" Fano plane.

A standard visualization of the Fano plane draws its seven points as the vertices, edge midpoints, and centroid of an equilateral triangle, and its seven lines as the three sides and three symmetry axes of the triangle, together with a circle through the three edge midpoints. However, the visual differences between the positions of these points and the shapes of these lines are merely an artifact of the visualization. As an abstract structure, the Fano plane is highly symmetric, with symmetries that take any point to any other point or that take any line to any other line.

== Homogeneous coordinates ==
The Fano plane can be constructed via linear algebra as the projective plane over the finite field with two elements. One can similarly construct projective planes over any other finite field, with the Fano plane being the smallest.

Using the standard construction of projective spaces via homogeneous coordinates, the seven points of the Fano plane may be labeled with the seven non-zero ordered triples of binary digits 001, 010, 011, 100, 101, 110, and 111. This can be done in such a way that for every two points p and q, the third point on line pq has the label formed by adding the labels of p and q modulo 2 digit by digit (e.g., 010 and 111 resulting in 101). In other words, the points of the Fano plane correspond to the non-zero points of the finite vector space of dimension 3 over the finite field of order 2.

Due to this construction, the Fano plane is considered to be a Desarguesian plane, even though the plane is too small to contain a non-degenerate Desargues configuration (which requires 10 points and 10 lines).

The lines of the Fano plane may also be given homogeneous coordinates, again using non-zero triples of binary digits. With this system of coordinates, a point is incident to a line if the coordinate for the point and the coordinate for the line have an even number of positions at which they both have nonzero bits: for instance, the point 101 belongs to the line 111, because they have nonzero bits at two common positions. In terms of the underlying linear algebra, a point belongs to a line if the inner product of the vectors representing the point and line is zero.

The lines can be classified into three types.

- On three of the lines the binary triples for the points have the 0 in a constant position: the line 100 (containing the points 001, 010, and 011) has 0 in the first position, and the lines 010 and 001 are formed in the same way.
- On three of the lines, two of the positions in the binary triples of each point have the same value: in the line 110 (containing the points 001, 110, and 111) the first and second positions are always equal to each other, and the lines 101 and 011 are formed in the same way.
- In the remaining line 111 (containing the points 011, 101, and 110), each binary triple has exactly two nonzero bits.

== Group-theoretic construction ==
Alternatively, the 7 points of the plane correspond to the 7 non-identity elements of the group (Z_{2})^{3} = Z_{2} × Z_{2} × Z_{2}. The lines of the plane correspond to the subgroups of order 4, isomorphic to Z_{2} × Z_{2}. The automorphism group GL(3, 2) of the group (Z_{2})^{3} is that of the Fano plane, and has order 168.

== Levi graph ==
Bipartite Heawood graph. Points are represented by vertices of one color and lines by vertices of the other color.

As with any incidence structure, the Levi graph of the Fano plane is a bipartite graph, the vertices of one part representing the points and the other representing the lines, with two vertices joined if the corresponding point and line are incident. This particular graph is a connected cubic graph (regular of degree 3), has girth 6 and each part contains 7 vertices. It is the Heawood graph, the unique 6-cage.

== Collineations ==
A collineation of the Fano plane corresponding to the 3-bit Gray code permutation

A collineation, automorphism, or symmetry of the Fano plane is a permutation of the 7 points that preserves collinearity: that is, it carries collinear points (on the same line) to collinear points. By the Fundamental theorem of projective geometry, the full collineation group (or automorphism group, or symmetry group) is the projective linear group PGL(3, 2), (Note: Actually it is PΓL(3, 2), but since the finite field of order 2 has no non-identity automorphisms, this becomes PGL(3, 2) also denoted PGL_{3}(F_{2}). Since the field has only one nonzero element, this group is isomorphic to the projective special linear group PSL(3, 2) and the general linear group GL(3, 2). It is also isomorphic to PSL(2, 7).)Hirschfeld 1979, p. 131

This is a well-known group of order 168 = 2^{3}·3·7, the next non-abelian simple group after A_{5} of order 60 (ordered by size).

As a permutation group acting on the 7 points of the plane, the collineation group is doubly transitive meaning that any ordered pair of points can be mapped by at least one collineation to any other ordered pair of points. (See below.)

Collineations may also be viewed as the color-preserving automorphisms of the Heawood graph (see figure).

=== Dualities ===
A bijection between the point set and the line set that preserves incidence is called a duality and a duality of order two is called a polarity.

Dualities can be viewed in the context of the Heawood graph as color reversing automorphisms. An example of a polarity is given by reflection through a vertical line that bisects the Heawood graph representation given on the right. The existence of this polarity shows that the Fano plane is self-dual. This is also an immediate consequence of the symmetry between points and lines in the definition of the incidence relation in terms of homogeneous coordinates, as detailed in an earlier section.

=== Cycle structure ===
A nimber numbering of the Fano plane

The permutation group of the 7 points has 6 conjugacy classes.

These four cycle structures each define a single conjugacy class:

- The identity permutation
- 21 permutations with two 2-cycles
- 42 permutations with a 4-cycle and a 2-cycle
- 56 permutations with two 3-cycles

The 48 permutations with a complete 7-cycle form two distinct conjugacy classes with 24 elements:

- A maps to B, B to C, C to D. Then D is on the same line as A and B.
- A maps to B, B to C, C to D. Then D is on the same line as A and C.

(See here for a complete list.)

The number of inequivalent colorings of the Fano plane with $n$ colors can be calculated by plugging the numbers of cycle structures into the Pólya enumeration theorem. This number of colorings is ${{n^7 + 21 n^5 + 98 n^3 + 48 n} \over 168}$ (sequence A241929 in the OEIS).

== Complete quadrangles and Fano subplanes ==
In any projective plane a set of four points, no three of which are collinear, and the six lines joining pairs of these points is a configuration known as a complete quadrangle. The lines are called sides and pairs of sides that do not meet at one of the four points are called opposite sides. The points at which opposite sides meet are called diagonal points and there are three of them.

If this configuration lies in a projective plane and the three diagonal points are collinear, then the seven points and seven lines of the expanded configuration form a subplane of the projective plane that is isomorphic to the Fano plane and is called a Fano subplane.

A famous result due to Andrew M. Gleason states that if every complete quadrangle in a finite projective plane extends to a Fano subplane (that is, has collinear diagonal points) then the plane is Desarguesian. Gleason called any projective plane satisfying this condition a Fano plane thus creating some confusion with modern terminology. To compound the confusion, Fano's axiom states that the diagonal points of a complete quadrangle are never collinear, a condition that holds in the Euclidean and real projective planes. Thus, what Gleason called Fano planes do not satisfy Fano's axiom.

== Configurations ==
The Fano plane contains the following numbers of configurations of points and lines of different types. For each type of configuration, the number of copies of configuration multiplied by the number of symmetries of the plane that keep the configuration unchanged is equal to 168, the size of the entire collineation group, provided each copy can be mapped to any other copy (see Orbit-stabiliser theorem). Since the Fano plane is self-dual, these configurations come in dual pairs and it can be shown that the number of collineations fixing a configuration equals the number of collineations that fix its dual configuration.

- There are 7 points with 24 symmetries fixing any point and dually, there are 7 lines with 24 symmetries fixing any line. The number of symmetries follows from the 2-transitivity of the collineation group, which implies the group acts transitively on the points.
- There are 42 ordered pairs of points, and each may be mapped by a symmetry onto any other ordered pair. For any ordered pair there are 4 symmetries fixing it. Correspondingly, there are 21 unordered pairs of points, each of which may be mapped by a symmetry onto any other unordered pair. For any unordered pair there are 8 symmetries fixing it.
- There are 21 flags consisting of a line and a point on that line. Each flag corresponds to the unordered pair of the other two points on the same line. For each flag, 8 different symmetries keep it fixed.
- There are 7 ways of selecting a quadrangle of four (unordered) points no three of which are collinear. These four points form the complement of a line, which is the diagonal line of the quadrangle and a collineation fixes the quadrangle if and only if it fixes the diagonal line. Thus, there are 24 symmetries that fix any such quadrangle. The dual configuration is a quadrilateral consisting of four lines no three of which meet at a point and their six points of intersection, it is the complement of a point in the Fano plane.
- There are $\tbinom{7}{3}$ = 35 triples of points, seven of which are collinear triples, leaving 28 non-collinear triples or triangles. The configuration consisting of the three points of a triangle and the three lines joining pairs of these points is represented by a 6-cycle in the Heawood graph. A color-preserving automorphism of the Heawood graph that fixes each vertex of a 6-cycle must be the identity automorphism. This means that there are 168 labeled triangles fixed only by the identity collineation and only six collineations that stabilize an unlabeled triangle, one for each permutation of the points. These 28 triangles may be viewed as corresponding to the 28 bitangents of a quartic. There are 84 ways of specifying a triangle together with one distinguished point on that triangle and two symmetries fixing this configuration. The dual of the triangle configuration is also a triangle.
- There are 28 ways of selecting a point and a line that are not incident to each other (an anti-flag), and six ways of permuting the Fano plane while keeping an anti-flag fixed. For every non-incident point-line pair (p, l), the three points that are unequal to p and that do not belong to l form a triangle, and for every triangle there is a unique way of grouping the remaining four points into an anti-flag.
- There are 28 ways of specifying a hexagon in which no three consecutive vertices lie on a line, and six symmetries fixing any such hexagon.
- There are 84 ways of specifying a pentagon in which no three consecutive vertices lie on a line, and two symmetries fixing any pentagon.

The Fano plane is an example of an (n_{3})-configuration, that is, a set of n points and n lines with three points on each line and three lines through each point. The Fano plane, a (7_{3})-configuration, is unique and is the smallest such configuration. According to a theorem by Steinitz configurations of this type can be realized in the Euclidean plane having at most one curved line (all other lines lying on Euclidean lines).

The upper figure is an alternative representation of the Fano plane in grid layout – compare with one of the finite projective plane of order 3 below

== Block design theory ==
The Fano plane is a small symmetric block design, specifically a 2-(7, 3, 1)-design. The points of the design are the points of the plane, and the blocks of the design are the lines of the plane. As such it is a valuable example in (block) design theory.

With the points labelled 0, 1, 2, ..., 6 the lines (as point sets) are the translates of the (7, 3, 1) planar difference set given by {0, 1, 3} in the group Z / 7Z. With the lines labeled ℓ_{0}, ..., ℓ_{6} the incidence matrix (table) is given by:

Point Line	0	1	2	3	4	5	6
ℓ_{0}	1	1	0	1	0	0	0
ℓ_{1}	0	1	1	0	1	0	0
ℓ_{2}	0	0	1	1	0	1	0
ℓ_{3}	0	0	0	1	1	0	1
ℓ_{4}	1	0	0	0	1	1	0
ℓ_{5}	0	1	0	0	0	1	1
ℓ_{6}	1	0	1	0	0	0	1

=== Steiner system ===
The Fano plane, as a block design, is a Steiner triple system. As such, it can be given the structure of a quasigroup. This quasigroup coincides with the multiplicative structure defined by the unit octonions e_{1}, e_{2}, ..., e_{7} (omitting 1) if the signs of the octonion products are ignored (Baez 2002).

== Matroid theory ==
The Fano matroid F_{7} is formed by taking the Fano plane's points as the ground set, and the three-element noncollinear subsets as bases.

The Fano plane is one of the important examples in the structure theory of matroids. Excluding the Fano plane as a matroid minor is necessary to characterize several important classes of matroids, such as regular, graphic, and cographic ones.

If you break one line apart into three 2-point lines you obtain the "non-Fano configuration", which can be embedded in the real plane. It is another important example in matroid theory, as it must be excluded for many theorems to hold.

The Fano plane redrawn as a planar graph

== PG(3, 2) ==
The Fano plane can be extended in a third dimension to form a three-dimensional projective space, denoted by PG(3, 2). It has 15 points, 35 lines, and 15 planes and is the smallest three-dimensional projective space. It also has the following properties:

- Each point is contained in 7 lines and 7 planes.
- Each line is contained in 3 planes and contains 3 points.
- Each plane contains 7 points and 7 lines.
- Each plane is isomorphic to the Fano plane.
- Every pair of distinct planes intersect in a line.
- A line and a plane not containing the line intersect in exactly one point.

== See also ==
- Projective configuration
- Pasch configuration
- Transylvania lottery
