= Incidence structure =

Abstract mathematical system of two types of objects and a relation between them

Examples of incidence structures: Example 1: points and lines of the Euclidean plane (top) Example 2: points and circles (middle), Example 3: finite incidence structure defined by an incidence matrix (bottom)

In mathematics, an incidence structure is an abstract system consisting of two types of objects and a single relationship between these types of objects. Consider the points and lines of the Euclidean plane as the two types of objects and ignore all the properties of this geometry except for the relation of which points are incident on which lines for all points and lines. What is left is the incidence structure of the Euclidean plane.

Incidence structures are most often considered in the geometrical context where they are abstracted from, and hence generalize, planes (such as affine, projective, and Möbius planes), but the concept is very broad and not limited to geometric settings. Even in a geometric setting, incidence structures are not limited to just points and lines; higher-dimensional objects (planes, solids, n-spaces, conics, etc.) can be used. The study of finite structures is sometimes called finite geometry.

== Formal definition and terminology ==
An incidence structure is a triple (P, L, I) where P is a set whose elements are called points, L is a distinct set whose elements are called lines and I ⊆ P × L is the incidence relation. The elements of I are called flags. If (p, l) is in I then one may say that point p "lies on" line l or that the line l "passes through" point p. A more "symmetric" terminology, to reflect the symmetric nature of this relation, is that "p is incident with l" or that "l is incident with p" and uses the notation p I l synonymously with (p, l) ∈ I.

In some common situations L may be a set of subsets of P in which case incidence I will be containment (p I l if and only if p is a member of l). Incidence structures of this type are called set-theoretic. This is not always the case, for example, if P is a set of vectors and L a set of square matrices, we may define
$$I = \{(v, M) : \vec v \text{ is an eigenvector of matrix } M \}.$$
This example also shows that while the geometric language of points and lines is used, the object types need not be these geometric objects.

== Examples ==
Some examples of incidence structures
1. Fano plane

2. Non-uniform structure

3. Generalized quadrangle

4. Möbius–Kantor configuration

5. Pappus configuration

An incidence structure is uniform if each line is incident with the same number of points. Each of these examples, except the second, is uniform with three points per line.

=== Graphs ===
Any graph (which need not be simple; loops and multiple edges are allowed) is a uniform incidence structure with two points per line. For these examples, the vertices of the graph form the point set, the edges of the graph form the line set, and incidence means that a vertex is an endpoint of an edge.

=== Linear spaces ===
Incidence structures are seldom studied in their full generality; it is typical to study incidence structures that satisfy some additional axioms. For instance, a partial linear space is an incidence structure that satisfies:

1. Any two distinct points are incident with at most one common line, and
2. Every line is incident with at least two points.

If the first axiom above is replaced by the stronger:

3. Any two distinct points are incident with exactly one common line,

the incidence structure is called a linear space.

=== Nets ===
A more specialized example is a k-net. This is an incidence structure in which the lines fall into k parallel classes, so that two lines in the same parallel class have no common points, but two lines in different classes have exactly one common point, and each point belongs to exactly one line from each parallel class. An example of a k-net is the set of points of an affine plane together with k parallel classes of affine lines.

== Dual structure ==
If we interchange the role of "points" and "lines" in
$$C = (P, L, I)$$
we obtain the dual structure,
$$C^* = (L, P, I^*)$$
where I^{∗} is the converse relation of I. It follows immediately from the definition that:
$$C^{**} = C$$

This is an abstract version of projective duality.

A structure C that is isomorphic to its dual C^{∗} is called self-dual. The Fano plane above is a self-dual incidence structure.

== Other terminology ==
The concept of an incidence structure is very simple and has arisen in several disciplines, each introducing its own vocabulary and specifying the types of questions that are typically asked about these structures. Incidence structures use geometric terminology, but in graph theory they are hypergraphs and in combinatorial design theory they are block designs. They are also known as a set system or family of sets in a general context.

=== Hypergraphs ===
Seven points are elements of seven lines in the Fano plane

Each hypergraph or set system can be regarded as an incidence structure in which the universal set plays the role of "points", the corresponding family of subsets plays the role of "lines" and the incidence relation is set membership "∈". Conversely, every incidence structure can be viewed as a hypergraph by identifying the lines with the sets of points that are incident with them.

=== Block designs ===
A (general) block design is a set X together with a family F of subsets of X (repeated subsets are allowed). Normally a block design is required to satisfy numerical regularity conditions. As an incidence structure, X is the set of points and F is the set of lines, usually called blocks in this context (repeated blocks must have distinct names, so F is actually a set and not a multiset). If all the subsets in F have the same size, the block design is called uniform. If each element of X appears in the same number of subsets, the block design is said to be regular. The dual of a uniform design is a regular design and vice versa.

==== Example: Fano plane ====
Consider the block design/hypergraph given by:
$$\begin{align}
P &= \{1,2,3,4,5,6,7\}, \\[2pt]
L &= \left\{ \begin{array}{ll}
\{1,2,3\}, & \{1,4,5\}, \\
\{1,6,7\}, & \{2,4,6\}, \\
\{2,5,7\}, & \{3,4,7\}, \\
\{3,5,6\} \end{array} \right\}.
\end{align}$$

This incidence structure is called the Fano plane. As a block design it is both uniform and regular.

In the labeling given, the lines are precisely the subsets of the points that consist of three points whose labels add up to zero using nim addition. Alternatively, each number, when written in binary, can be identified with a non-zero vector of length three over the binary field. Three vectors that generate a subspace form a line; in this case, that is equivalent to their vector sum being the zero vector.

== Representations ==
Incidence structures may be represented in many ways. If the sets P and L are finite these representations can compactly encode all the relevant information concerning the structure.

=== Incidence matrix ===
The incidence matrix of a (finite) incidence structure is a (0,1) matrix that has its rows indexed by the points {p_{i}} and columns indexed by the lines {l_{j}} where the ij-th entry is a 1 if p_{i} I l_{j} and 0 otherwise. (Note: The other convention of indexing the rows by lines and the columns by points is also widely used.) An incidence matrix is not uniquely determined since it depends upon the arbitrary ordering of the points and the lines.

The non-uniform incidence structure pictured above (example number 2) is given by:
$$\begin{align}
P &= \{ A, B, C, D, E, P \} \\[2pt]
L &= \left\{ \begin{array}{ll}
l = \{C, P, E \}, & m = \{ P \}, \\
n = \{ P, D \}, & o = \{ P, A \}, \\
p = \{ A, B \}, & q = \{ P, B \} \end{array} \right\}
\end{align}$$

An incidence matrix for this structure is:
$$\begin{pmatrix}
0 & 0 & 0 & 1 & 1 & 0 \\
0 & 0 & 0 & 0 & 1 & 1 \\
1 & 0 & 0 & 0 & 0 & 0 \\
0 & 0 & 1 & 0 & 0 & 0 \\
1 & 0 & 0 & 0 & 0 & 0 \\
1 & 1 & 1 & 1 & 0 & 1
\end{pmatrix}$$
which corresponds to the incidence table:

I	l	m	n	o	p	q
A	0	0	0	1	1	0
B	0	0	0	0	1	1
C	1	0	0	0	0	0
D	0	0	1	0	0	0
E	1	0	0	0	0	0
P	1	1	1	1	0	1

If an incidence structure C has an incidence matrix M, then the dual structure C^{∗} has the transpose matrix M^{T} as its incidence matrix (and is defined by that matrix).

An incidence structure is self-dual if there exists an ordering of the points and lines so that the incidence matrix constructed with that ordering is a symmetric matrix.

With the labels as given in example number 1 above and with points ordered A, B, C, D, G, F, E and lines ordered l, p, n, s, r, m, q, the Fano plane has the incidence matrix:
$$\begin{pmatrix}
1 & 1 & 1 & 0 & 0 & 0 & 0\\
1 & 0 & 0 & 1 & 1 & 0 & 0 \\
1 & 0 & 0 & 0 & 0 & 1 & 1 \\
0 & 1 & 0 & 1 & 0 & 1 & 0 \\
0 & 1 & 0 & 0 & 1 & 0 & 1 \\
0 & 0 & 1 & 1 & 0 & 0 & 1 \\
0 & 0 & 1 & 0 & 1 & 1 & 0
\end{pmatrix} .$$
Since this is a symmetric matrix, the Fano plane is a self-dual incidence structure.

=== Pictorial representations ===
An incidence figure (that is, a depiction of an incidence structure), is constructed by representing the points by dots in a plane and having some visual means of joining the dots to correspond to lines. The dots may be placed in any manner, there are no restrictions on distances between points or any relationships between points. In an incidence structure there is no concept of a point being between two other points; the order of points on a line is undefined. Compare this with ordered geometry, which does have a notion of betweenness. The same statements can be made about the depictions of the lines. In particular, lines need not be depicted by "straight line segments" (see examples 1, 3 and 4 above). As with the pictorial representation of graphs, the crossing of two "lines" at any place other than a dot has no meaning in terms of the incidence structure; it is only an accident of the representation. These incidence figures may at times resemble graphs, but they aren't graphs unless the incidence structure is a graph.

==== Realizability ====
Incidence structures can be modelled by points and curves in the Euclidean plane with the usual geometric meaning of incidence. Some incidence structures admit representation by points and (straight) lines. Structures that can be are called realizable. If no ambient space is mentioned then the Euclidean plane is assumed. The Fano plane (example 1 above) is not realizable since it needs at least one curve. The Möbius–Kantor configuration (example 4 above) is not realizable in the Euclidean plane, but it is realizable in the complex plane. On the other hand, examples 2 and 5 above are realizable and the incidence figures given there demonstrate this. Steinitz (1894) has shown that n_{3}-configurations (incidence structures with n points and n lines, three points per line and three lines through each point) are either realizable or require the use of only one curved line in their representations. The Fano plane is the unique (7_{3}) and the Möbius–Kantor configuration is the unique (8_{3}).

=== Incidence graph (Levi graph) ===
Heawood graph with labeling

Each incidence structure C corresponds to a bipartite graph called the Levi graph or incidence graph of the structure. As any bipartite graph is two-colorable, the Levi graph can be given a black and white vertex coloring, where black vertices correspond to points and white vertices correspond to lines of C. The edges of this graph correspond to the flags (incident point/line pairs) of the incidence structure. The original Levi graph was the incidence graph of the generalized quadrangle of order two (example 3 above), but the term has been extended by H.S.M. Coxeter to refer to an incidence graph of any incidence structure.

Levi graph of the Möbius–Kantor configuration (#4)

==== Levi graph examples ====
The Levi graph of the Fano plane is the Heawood graph. Since the Heawood graph is connected and vertex-transitive, there exists an automorphism (such as the one defined by a reflection about the vertical axis in the figure of the Heawood graph) interchanging black and white vertices. This, in turn, implies that the Fano plane is self-dual.

The specific representation, on the left, of the Levi graph of the Möbius–Kantor configuration (example 4 above) illustrates that a rotation of π/4 about the center (either clockwise or counterclockwise) of the diagram interchanges the blue and red vertices and maps edges to edges. That is to say that there exists a color interchanging automorphism of this graph. Consequently, the incidence structure known as the Möbius–Kantor configuration is self-dual.

== Generalization ==
It is possible to generalize the notion of an incidence structure to include more than two types of objects. A structure with k types of objects is called an incidence structure of rank k or a rank k geometry. Formally these are defined as k + 1 tuples S = (P_{1}, P_{2}, ..., P_{k}, I) with P_{i} ∩ P_{j} = ∅ and
$$I \subseteq \bigcup_{i < j} P_i \times P_j.$$

The Levi graph for these structures is defined as a multipartite graph with vertices corresponding to each type being colored the same.

== See also ==
- Abstract polytope
- Incidence (geometry)
- Incidence geometry
- Projective configuration

== Bibliography ==
- Beth, Thomas; Jungnickel, Dieter; Lenz, Hanfried (1986), Design Theory, Cambridge University Press, ISBN 3-411-01675-2
- Biliotti, Mauro; Jha, Vikram; Johnson, Norman L. (2001), Foundations of Translation Planes, Marcel Dekker, ISBN 0-8247-0609-9
- Colbourn, Charles J.; Dinitz, Jeffrey H. (2007), Handbook of Combinatorial Designs (2nd ed.), Boca Raton: Chapman & Hall/ CRC, ISBN 978-1-58488-506-1
- Dembowski, Peter (1968), Finite geometries, Ergebnisse der Mathematik und ihrer Grenzgebiete, Band 44, Berlin, New York: Springer-Verlag, ISBN 3-540-61786-8, MR 0233275
- Moorhouse, G. Eric (2014). "Incidence Geometry" (PDF) – via John Baez at University of California, Riverside.
- Pisanski, Tomaž; Servatius, Brigitte (2013), Configurations from a Graphical Viewpoint, Springer, doi:10.1007/978-0-8176-8364-1, ISBN 978-0-8176-8363-4
