= Polar space =

Concept in geometry

In mathematics, in the field of geometry, a polar space of rank n (n ≥ 3), or projective index n − 1, consists of a set P, conventionally called the set of points, together with certain subsets of P, called subspaces, that satisfy these axioms:

- Every subspace is isomorphic to a projective space P^{d}(K) with −1 ≤ d ≤ (n − 1) and K a division ring. (That is, it is a Desarguesian projective geometry.) For each subspace the corresponding d is called its dimension.
- The intersection of two subspaces is always a subspace.
- For each subspace A of dimension n − 1 and each point p not in A, there is a unique subspace B of dimension n − 1 containing p and such that A ∩ B is (n − 2)-dimensional. The points in A ∩ B are exactly the points of A that are in a common subspace of dimension 1 with p.
- There are at least two disjoint subspaces of dimension n − 1.

It is possible to define and study a slightly bigger class of objects using only the relationship between points and lines: a polar space is a partial linear space (P,L), so that for each point p ∈ P and each line l ∈ L, the set of points of l collinear to p is either a singleton or the whole l.

Finite polar spaces (where P is a finite set) are also studied as combinatorial objects.

== Generalized quadrangles ==
Generalized quadrangle with three points per line; a polar space of rank 2

A polar space of rank two is a generalized quadrangle; in this case, in the latter definition, the set of points of a line $l$ collinear with a point p is the whole of $l$ only if p ∈ $l$. One recovers the former definition from the latter under the assumptions that lines have more than 2 points, points lie on more than 2 lines, and there exist a line $l$ and a point p not on $l$ so that p is collinear to all points of $l$.

== Finite classical polar spaces ==
Let $PG(n,q)$ be the projective space of dimension $n$ over the finite field $\mathbb{F} _q$ and let $f$ be a reflexive sesquilinear form or a quadratic form on the underlying vector space. The elements of the finite classical polar space associated with this form are the elements of the totally isotropic subspaces (when $f$ is a sesquilinear form) or the totally singular subspaces (when $f$ is a quadratic form) of $PG(n,q)$ with respect to $f$. The Witt index of the form is equal to the largest vector space dimension of the subspace contained in the polar space, and it is called the rank of the polar space. These finite classical polar spaces can be summarised by the following table, where $n$ is the dimension of the underlying projective space and $r$ is the rank of the polar space. The number of points in a $PG(k,q)$ is denoted by $\theta_k(q)$ and it is equal to $q^k + q^{k-1} + \cdots + 1$. When $r$ is equal to $2$, we get a generalized quadrangle.

Form	$n + 1$	Name	Notation	Number of points	Collineation group
Alternating	$2r$	Symplectic	$W(2r - 1, q)$	$(q^r +1)\theta_{r-1}(q)$	$\mathrm{P \Gamma Sp}(2r,q)$
Hermitian	$2r$	Hermitian	$H(2r-1,q)$	$(q^{r - 1/2} + 1)\theta_{r-1}(q)$	$\mathrm{P \Gamma U(2r,q)}$
Hermitian	$2r + 1$	Hermitian	$H(2r,q)$	$(q^{r + 1/2} + 1) \theta_{r - 1}(q)$	$\mathrm{P \Gamma U(2r+1,q)}$
Quadratic	$2r$	Hyperbolic	$Q^+(2r-1,q)$	$(q^{r-1} + 1) \theta_{r-1}(q)$	$\mathrm{P \Gamma O^+}(2r,q)$
Quadratic	$2r + 1$	Parabolic	$Q(2r,q)$	$(q^r + 1)\theta_{r-1}(q)$	$\mathrm{P \Gamma O}(2r+1,q)$
Quadratic	$2r + 2$	Elliptic	$Q^-(2r + 1,q)$	$(q^{r + 1} + 1)\theta_{r-1}(q)$	$\mathrm{P \Gamma O^-}(2r + 2,q)$

== Classification ==
Jacques Tits proved that a finite polar space of rank at least three is always isomorphic with one of the three types of classical polar space given above. This leaves open only the problem of classifying the finite generalized quadrangles.
