= Projective plane =

Geometric concept of a 2D space with "points at infinity" adjoined

Drawings of the finite projective planes of orders 2 (the Fano plane) and 3, in grid layout, showing a method of creating such drawings for prime orders

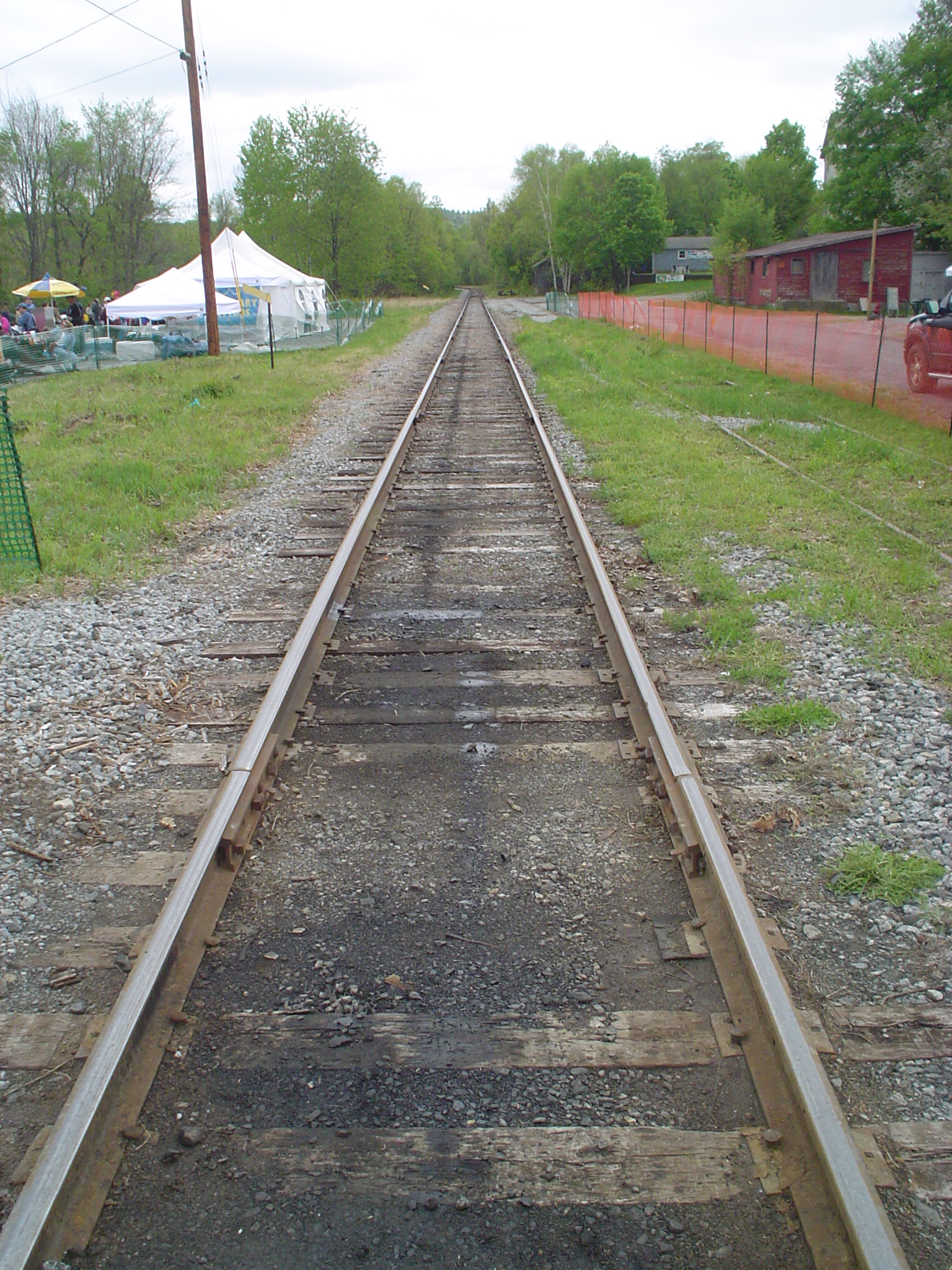
These parallel lines appear to intersect in the vanishing point "at infinity". In a projective plane this is actually true.

In mathematics, a projective plane is a geometric structure that extends the concept of a plane. In the ordinary Euclidean plane, two lines typically intersect at a single point, but there are some pairs of lines (namely, parallel lines) that do not intersect. A projective plane can be thought of as an ordinary plane equipped with additional "points at infinity" where parallel lines intersect. Thus any two distinct lines in a projective plane intersect at exactly one point.

Renaissance artists, in developing the techniques of drawing in perspective, laid the groundwork for this mathematical topic. The archetypical example is the real projective plane, also known as the extended Euclidean plane. This example, in slightly different guises, is important in algebraic geometry, topology and projective geometry where it may be denoted variously by PG(2, R), RP^{2}, or P_{2}(R), among other notations. There are many other projective planes, both infinite, such as the complex projective plane, and finite, such as the Fano plane.

A projective plane is a 2-dimensional projective space. Not all projective planes can be embedded in 3-dimensional projective spaces; such embeddability is a consequence of a property known as Desargues' theorem, not shared by all projective planes.

== Definition ==
A projective plane is a rank 2 incidence structure $({\mathcal P},{\mathcal L},I)$ consisting of a set of points ${\mathcal P}$, a set of lines ${\mathcal L}$, and a symmetric relation $I$ on the set ${\mathcal P}\cup{\mathcal L}$ called incidence, having the following properties:

1. Given any two distinct points, there is exactly one line incident with both of them.
2. Given any two distinct lines, there is exactly one point incident with both of them.
3. There are four points such that no line is incident with more than two of them.

The second condition means that there are no parallel lines. The last condition excludes the so-called degenerate cases (see below). The term "incidence" is used to emphasize the symmetric nature of the relationship between points and lines. Thus the expression "point P is incident with line ℓ" is used instead of either "P is on ℓ" or "ℓ passes through P".

It follows from the definition that the number of points $s+1$ incident with any given line in a projective plane is the same as the number of lines incident with any given point. The (possibly infinite) cardinal number $s$ is called order of the plane.

== Examples ==
=== The extended Euclidean plane ===
To turn the ordinary Euclidean plane into a projective plane, proceed as follows:

1. To each parallel class of lines (a maximum set of mutually parallel lines) associate a single new point. That point is to be considered incident with each line in its class. The new points added are distinct from each other. These new points are called points at infinity.
2. Add a new line, which is considered incident with all the points at infinity (and no other points). This line is called the line at infinity.

The extended structure is a projective plane and is called the extended Euclidean plane or the real projective plane. The process outlined above, used to obtain it, is called "projective completion" or projectivization. This plane can also be constructed by starting from R^{3} viewed as a vector space, see § Vector space construction below.

=== Projective Moulton plane ===
The Moulton plane. Lines sloping down and to the right are bent where they cross the y-axis.

The points of the Moulton plane are the points of the Euclidean plane, with coordinates in the usual way. To create the Moulton plane from the Euclidean plane some of the lines are redefined. That is, some of their point sets will be changed, but other lines will remain unchanged. Redefine all the lines with negative slopes so that they look like "bent" lines, meaning that these lines keep their points with negative x-coordinates, but the rest of their points are replaced with the points of the line with the same y-intercept but twice the slope wherever their x-coordinate is positive.

The Moulton plane has parallel classes of lines and is an affine plane. It can be projectivized, as in the previous example, to obtain the projective Moulton plane. Desargues's theorem is not a valid theorem in either the Moulton plane or the projective Moulton plane.

=== A finite example ===
This example has just thirteen points and thirteen lines. We label the points P_{1}, ..., P_{13} and the lines m_{1}, ..., m_{13}. The incidence relation (which points are on which lines) can be given by the following incidence matrix. The rows are labelled by the points and the columns are labelled by the lines. A 1 in row i and column j means that the point P_{i} is on the line m_{j}, while a 0 (which we represent here by a blank cell for ease of reading) means that they are not incident. The matrix is in Paige–Wexler normal form.

Lines Points	m_{1}	m_{2}	m_{3}	m_{4}	m_{5}	m_{6}	m_{7}	m_{8}	m_{9}	m_{10}	m_{11}	m_{12}	m_{13}
P_{1}	1	1	1	1									
P_{2}	1				1	1	1						
P_{3}	1							1	1	1			
P_{4}	1										1	1	1
P_{5}		1			1			1			1		
P_{6}		1				1			1			1	
P_{7}		1					1			1			1
P_{8}			1		1				1				1
P_{9}			1			1				1	1		
P_{10}			1				1	1				1	
P_{11}				1	1					1		1	
P_{12}				1		1		1					1
P_{13}				1			1		1		1		

To verify the conditions that make this a projective plane, observe that every two rows have exactly one common column in which 1s appear (every pair of distinct points are on exactly one common line) and that every two columns have exactly one common row in which 1s appear (every pair of distinct lines meet at exactly one point). Among many possibilities, the points P_{1}, P_{4}, P_{5}, and P_{8}, for example, will satisfy the third condition. This example is known as the projective plane of order three.

== Vector space construction ==
Though the line at infinity of the extended real plane may appear to have a different nature than the other lines of that projective plane, this is not the case. Another construction of the same projective plane shows that no line can be distinguished (on geometrical grounds) from any other. In this construction, each "point" of the real projective plane is the one-dimensional subspace (a geometric line) through the origin in a 3-dimensional vector space, and a "line" in the projective plane arises from a (geometric) plane through the origin in the 3-space. This idea can be generalized and made more precise as follows.

Let K be any division ring (skewfield). Let K^{3} denote the set of all triples x = (x_{0}, x_{1}, x_{2}) of elements of K (a Cartesian product viewed as a vector space). For any nonzero x in K^{3}, the minimal subspace of K^{3} containing x (which may be visualized as all the vectors in a line through the origin) is the subset

$$\{ k x : k \in K \}$$

of K^{3}. Similarly, let x and y be linearly independent elements of K^{3}, meaning that kx + my = 0 implies that k = m = 0. The minimal subspace of K^{3} containing x and y (which may be visualized as all the vectors in a plane through the origin) is the subset

$$\{k x + m y : k, m \in K\}$$

of K^{3}. This 2-dimensional subspace contains various 1-dimensional subspaces through the origin that may be obtained by fixing k and m and taking the multiples of the resulting vector. Different choices of k and m that are in the same ratio will give the same line.

The projective plane over K, denoted PG(2, K) or KP^{2}, has a set of points consisting of all the 1-dimensional subspaces in K^{3}. A subset L of the points of PG(2, K) is a line in PG(2, K) if there exists a 2-dimensional subspace of K^{3} whose set of 1-dimensional subspaces is exactly L.

Verifying that this construction produces a projective plane is usually left as a linear algebra exercise.

An alternate (algebraic) view of this construction is as follows. The points of this projective plane are the equivalence classes of the set K^{3} \ {(0, 0, 0)} modulo the equivalence relation

x ~ kx, for all k in K^{×}.

Lines in the projective plane are defined exactly as above.

The coordinates (x_{0}, x_{1}, x_{2}) of a point in PG(2, K) are called homogeneous coordinates. Each triple (x_{0}, x_{1}, x_{2}) represents a well-defined point in PG(2, K), except for the triple (0, 0, 0), which represents no point. Each point in PG(2, K), however, is represented by many triples.

If K is a topological space, then KP^{2} inherits a topology via the product, subspace, and quotient topologies.

=== Classical examples ===
The real projective plane RP^{2} arises when K is taken to be the real numbers, R. As a closed, non-orientable real 2-manifold, it serves as a fundamental example in topology.

In this construction, consider the unit sphere centered at the origin in R^{3}. Each of the R^{3} lines in this construction intersects the sphere at two antipodal points. Since the R^{3} line represents a point of RP^{2}, we will obtain the same model of RP^{2} by identifying the antipodal points of the sphere. The lines of RP^{2} will be the great circles of the sphere after this identification of antipodal points. This description gives the standard model of elliptic geometry.

The complex projective plane CP^{2} arises when K is taken to be the complex numbers, C. It is a closed complex 2-manifold, and hence a closed, orientable real 4-manifold. It and projective planes over other fields (known as pappian planes) serve as fundamental examples in algebraic geometry.

The quaternionic projective plane HP^{2} is also of independent interest.

=== Finite fields ===
By Wedderburn's Theorem, a finite division ring must be commutative and so be a field. Taking K to be the finite field of q = p^{n} elements with prime p produces a projective plane of q^{2} + q + 1 points. These planes are usually denoted by PG(2, q) where PG stands for projective geometry, the "2" is the dimension and q is called the order of the plane (it is one less than the number of points on any line). The Fano plane, discussed below, is denoted by PG(2, 2). The third example above is the projective plane PG(2, 3).

The Fano plane. Points are shown as dots; lines are shown as lines or circles.

The Fano plane is the projective plane arising from the field of two elements. It is the smallest projective plane, with only seven points and seven lines. In the figure at right, the seven points are shown as small balls, and the seven lines are shown as six line segments and a circle. However, one could equivalently consider the balls to be the "lines" and the line segments and circle to be the "points" – this is an example of duality in the projective plane: if the lines and points are interchanged, the result is still a projective plane (see below). A permutation of the seven points that carries collinear points (points on the same line) to collinear points is called a collineation or symmetry of the plane. The collineations of a geometry form a group under composition, and for the Fano plane this group has 168 elements. It is the projective semilinear group PΓL(3, 2), which in this case coincides with the projective linear group PGL(3, 2) because the plane has prime order, $q=2^1$, and thus the finite field $\operatorname{GF}(q)$ has no nontrivial automorphisms.

=== Desargues' theorem and Desarguesian planes ===
The theorem of Desargues is universally valid in a projective plane if and only if the plane can be constructed from a three-dimensional vector space over a skewfield as above. These planes are called Desarguesian planes, named after Girard Desargues. The real (or complex) projective plane and the projective plane of order 3 given above are examples of Desarguesian projective planes.

=== Non-Desarguesian planes ===
The projective planes that can not be constructed in the preceding manner are called non-Desarguesian planes, and the Moulton plane given above is an example of one. Many such finite and infinite planes are known.

The PG(2, K) notation is reserved for Desarguesian planes. When K is a field, a very common case, they are also known as field planes, and if the field is a finite field they can be called finite field planes or Galois planes.

== Subplanes ==
A subplane of a projective plane $({\mathcal P},{\mathcal L},I)$ is a projective plane $({\mathcal P'},{\mathcal L'},I')$ with ${\mathcal P'}\subseteq{\mathcal P}$, ${\mathcal L'}\subseteq{\mathcal L}$ and $I'$ the restriction of the incidence relation $I$ to $({\mathcal P'}\cup{\mathcal L'})\times({\mathcal P'}\cup{\mathcal L'})$.

(Bruck 1955) proves the following theorem. Let Π be a finite projective plane of order N with a proper subplane Π_{0} of order M. Then either N = M^{2} or N ≥ M^{2} + M.

A subplane $({\mathcal P'},{\mathcal L'},I')$ of $({\mathcal P},{\mathcal L},I)$ is a Baer subplane if every line in ${\mathcal L}\setminus{\mathcal L'}$ is incident with exactly one point in $\mathcal P'$ and every point in ${\mathcal P}\setminus{\mathcal P'}$ is incident with exactly one line of $\mathcal L'$.

A finite Desarguesian projective plane of order $q$ admits Baer subplanes (all necessarily Desarguesian) if and only if $q$ is square; in this case the order of the Baer subplanes is $\sqrt{q}$.

In the finite Desarguesian planes PG(2, p^{n}), the subplanes have orders which are the orders of the subfields of the finite field GF(p^{n}), that is, p^{i} where i is a divisor of n. In non-Desarguesian planes however, Bruck's theorem gives the only information about subplane orders. The case of equality in the inequality of this theorem is not known to occur. Whether or not there exists a subplane of order M in a plane of order N with M^{2} + M = N is an open question. If such subplanes existed there would be projective planes of composite (non-prime power) order.

=== Fano subplanes ===
A Fano subplane is a subplane isomorphic to PG(2, 2), the unique projective plane of order 2.

If you consider a quadrangle (a set of 4 points no three collinear) in this plane, the points determine six of the lines of the plane. The remaining three points (called the diagonal points of the quadrangle) are the points where the lines that do not intersect at a point of the quadrangle meet. The seventh line consists of all the diagonal points (usually drawn as a circle or semicircle).

In finite Desarguesian planes, PG(2, q), Fano subplanes exist if and only if q is even (that is, a power of 2). An open question, widely attributed to Hanna Neumann, though it does not appear in her published work, is: Does every non-Desarguesian plane contain a Fano subplane? They could exist in any non-Desarguesian plane, and indeed, they have been shown to exist in several families of non-Desarguesian planes, including Figueroa planes, Hughes planes and many translation planes.

A theorem concerning Fano subplanes due to (Gleason 1956) is:

If every quadrangle in a finite projective plane has collinear diagonal points, then the plane is Desarguesian (of even order).

== Affine planes ==
Projectivization of the Euclidean plane produced the real projective plane. The inverse operation—starting with a projective plane, remove one line and all the points incident with that line—produces an affine plane.

=== Definition ===
More formally an affine plane consists of a set of lines and a set of points, and a relation between points and lines called incidence, having the following properties:

1. Given any two distinct points, there is exactly one line incident with both of them.
2. Given any line l and any point P not incident with l, there is exactly one line incident with P that does not meet l.
3. There are four points such that no line is incident with more than two of them.

The second condition means that there are parallel lines and is known as Playfair's axiom. The expression "does not meet" in this condition is shorthand for "there does not exist a point incident with both lines".

The Euclidean plane and the Moulton plane are examples of infinite affine planes. A finite projective plane will produce a finite affine plane when one of its lines and the points on it are removed. The order of a finite affine plane is the number of points on any of its lines (this will be the same number as the order of the projective plane from which it comes). The affine planes which arise from the projective planes PG(2, q) are denoted by AG(2, q). For any division ring K, the set K^{2} with lines given by translated subspaces $\{a+kb: k\in K\}$ forms an affine space, and AG(2,q) ~ GF(q)^{2}.

There is a projective plane of order N if and only if there is an affine plane of order N. When there is only one affine plane of order N there is only one projective plane of order N, but the converse is not true. The affine planes formed by the removal of different lines of the projective plane will be isomorphic if and only if the removed lines are in the same orbit of the collineation group of the projective plane. These statements hold for infinite projective planes as well.

=== Construction of projective planes from affine planes ===
The affine plane K^{2} over K embeds into KP^{2} via the map which sends affine (non-homogeneous) coordinates to homogeneous coordinates,

$$(x_1, x_2) \mapsto (1, x_1, x_2).$$

The complement of the image is the set of points of the form (0, x_{1}, x_{2}). From the point of view of the embedding just given, these points are the points at infinity. They constitute a line in KP^{2}—namely, the line arising from the plane

$$\{k (0, 0, 1) + m (0, 1, 0) : k, m \in K\}$$

in K^{3}—called the line at infinity. The points at infinity are the "extra" points where parallel lines intersect in the construction of the extended real plane; the point (0, x_{1}, x_{2}) is where all lines of slope x_{2} / x_{1} intersect. Consider for example the two lines

$$u = \{(x, 0) : x \in K\}$$
$$y = \{(x, 1) : x \in K\}$$

in the affine plane K^{2}. These lines have slope 0 and do not intersect. They can be regarded as subsets of KP^{2} via the embedding above, but these subsets are not lines in KP^{2}. Add the point (0, 1, 0) to each subset; that is, let

$$\bar{u} = \{(1, x, 0) : x \in K\} \cup \{(0, 1, 0)\}$$
$$\bar{y} = \{(1, x, 1) : x \in K\} \cup \{(0, 1, 0)\}$$

These are lines in KP^{2}; ū arises from the plane

$$\{k (1, 0, 0) + m (0, 1, 0) : k, m \in K\}$$

in K^{3}, while ȳ arises from the plane

$${k (1, 0, 1) + m (0, 1, 0) : k, m \in K}.$$

The projective lines ū and ȳ intersect at (0, 1, 0). In fact, all lines in K^{2} of slope 0, when projectivized in this manner, intersect at (0, 1, 0) in KP^{2}.

The embedding of K^{2} into KP^{2} given above is not unique. Each embedding produces its own notion of points at infinity. For example, the embedding

$$(x_1, x_2) \to (x_2, 1, x_1),$$

has as its complement those points of the form (x_{0}, 0, x_{2}), which are then regarded as points at infinity.

When an affine plane does not have the form of K^{2} with K a division ring, it can still be embedded in a projective plane, but the construction used above does not work. A commonly used method for carrying out the embedding in this case involves expanding the set of affine coordinates and working in a more general "algebra".

=== Generalized coordinates ===
One can construct a coordinate "ring"—a so-called planar ternary ring (not a genuine ring)—corresponding to any projective plane. A planar ternary ring need not be a field or division ring, and there are many projective planes that are not constructed from a division ring. They are called non-Desarguesian projective planes and are an active area of research. The Cayley plane (OP^{2}), a projective plane over the octonions, is one of these because the octonions do not form a division ring.

Conversely, given a planar ternary ring (R, T), a projective plane can be constructed (see below). The relationship is not one to one. A projective plane may be associated with several non-isomorphic planar ternary rings. The ternary operator T can be used to produce two binary operators on the set R, by:

a + b = T(a, 1, b), and
a ⋅ b = T(a, b, 0).

The ternary operator is linear if T(x, m, k) = x⋅m + k. When the set of coordinates of a projective plane actually form a ring, a linear ternary operator may be defined in this way, using the ring operations on the right, to produce a planar ternary ring.

Algebraic properties of this planar ternary coordinate ring turn out to correspond to geometric incidence properties of the plane. For example, Desargues' theorem corresponds to the coordinate ring being obtained from a division ring, while Pappus's theorem corresponds to this ring being obtained from a commutative field. A projective plane satisfying Pappus's theorem universally is called a Pappian plane. Alternative, not necessarily associative, division algebras like the octonions correspond to Moufang planes.

There is no known purely geometric proof of the purely geometric statement that Desargues' theorem implies Pappus' theorem in a finite projective plane (finite Desarguesian planes are Pappian). (The converse is true in any projective plane and is provable geometrically, but finiteness is essential in this statement as there are infinite Desarguesian planes which are not Pappian.) The most common proof uses coordinates in a division ring and Wedderburn's theorem that finite division rings must be commutative; Bamberg & Penttila (2015) give a proof that uses only more "elementary" algebraic facts about division rings.

To describe a finite projective plane of order N(≥ 2) using non-homogeneous coordinates and a planar ternary ring:

Let one point be labelled (∞).
Label N points, (r) where r = 0, ..., (N − 1).
Label N^{2} points, (r, c) where r, c = 0, ..., (N − 1).

On these points, construct the following lines:

One line [∞] = { (∞), (0), ..., (N − 1)}
N lines [c] = {(∞), (c, 0), ..., (c, N − 1)}, where c = 0, ..., (N − 1)
N^{2} lines [r, c] = {(r) and the points (x, T(x, r, c)) }, where x, r, c = 0, ..., (N − 1) and T is the ternary operator of the planar ternary ring.

For example, for N = 2 we can use the symbols {0, 1} associated with the finite field of order 2. The ternary operation defined by T(x, m, k) = xm + k with the operations on the right being the multiplication and addition in the field yields the following:

One line [∞] = { (∞), (0), (1)},
2 lines [c] = {(∞), (c,0), (c,1) : c = 0, 1},

[0] = {(∞), (0,0), (0,1) }
[1] = {(∞), (1,0), (1,1) }

4 lines [r, c]: (r) and the points (i, ir + c), where i = 0, 1 : r, c = 0, 1.

[0,0]: {(0), (0,0), (1,0) }
[0,1]: {(0), (0,1), (1,1) }
[1,0]: {(1), (0,0), (1,1) }
[1,1]: {(1), (0,1), (1,0) }

== Degenerate planes ==
(Non-empty) degenerate projective planes

Degenerate planes do not fulfill the third condition in the definition of a projective plane. They are not structurally complex enough to be interesting in their own right, but from time to time they arise as special cases in general arguments. There are seven kinds of degenerate plane according to (Albert & Sandler 1968). They are:

1. the empty set;
2. a single point, no lines;
3. a single line, no points;
4. a single point, a collection of lines, the point is incident with all of the lines;
5. a single line, a collection of points, the points are all incident with the line;
6. a point P incident with a line m, an arbitrary collection of lines all incident with P and an arbitrary collection of points all incident with m;
7. a point P not incident with a line m, an arbitrary (can be empty) collection of lines all incident with P and all the points of intersection of these lines with m.

These seven cases are not independent, the fourth and fifth can be considered as special cases of the sixth, while the second and third are special cases of the fourth and fifth respectively. The special case of the seventh plane with no additional lines can be seen as an eighth plane. All the cases can therefore be organized into two self-dual families of degenerate planes as follows (this representation is for finite degenerate planes, but may be extended to infinite ones in a natural way):

1) For any number of points P_{1}, ..., P_{n}, and lines L_{1}, ..., L_{m},

L_{1} = { P_{1}, P_{2}, ..., P_{n}}
L_{2} = { P_{1} }
L_{3} = { P_{1} }
...
L_{m} = { P_{1} }

2) For any number of points P_{1}, ..., P_{n}, and lines L_{1}, ..., L_{n}, (same number of points as lines)

L_{1} = { P_{2}, P_{3}, ..., P_{n} }
L_{2} = { P_{1}, P_{2} }
L_{3} = { P_{1}, P_{3} }
...
L_{n} = { P_{1}, P_{n} }

== Collineations ==
A collineation of a projective plane is a bijective map of the plane to itself which maps points to points and lines to lines that preserves incidence, meaning that if σ is a bijection and point P is on line m, then P^{σ} is on m^{σ}.

If σ is a collineation of a projective plane, a point P with P = P^{σ} is called a fixed point of σ, and a line m with m = m^{σ} is called a fixed line of σ. The points on a fixed line need not be fixed points, their images under σ are just constrained to lie on this line. The collection of fixed points and fixed lines of a collineation form a closed configuration, which is a system of points and lines that satisfy the first two but not necessarily the third condition in the definition of a projective plane. Thus, the fixed point and fixed line structure for any collineation either form a projective plane by themselves, or a degenerate plane. Collineations whose fixed structure forms a plane are called planar collineations.

=== Homography ===
A homography (or projective transformation) of PG(2, K) is a collineation of this type of projective plane which is a linear transformation of the underlying vector space. Using homogeneous coordinates they can be represented by invertible 3 × 3 matrices over K which act on the points of PG(2, K) by y = M x^{T}, where x and y are points in K^{3} (vectors) and M is an invertible 3 × 3 matrix over K. Two matrices represent the same projective transformation if one is a constant multiple of the other. Thus the group of projective transformations is the quotient of the general linear group by the scalar matrices called the projective linear group.

Another type of collineation of PG(2, K) is induced by any automorphism of K, these are called automorphic collineations. If α is an automorphism of K, then the collineation given by (x_{0}, x_{1}, x_{2}) → (x_{0}^{α}, x_{1}^{α}, x_{2}^{α}) is an automorphic collineation. The fundamental theorem of projective geometry says that all the collineations of PG(2, K) are compositions of homographies and automorphic collineations. Automorphic collineations are planar collineations.

== Plane duality ==
A projective plane is defined axiomatically as an incidence structure, in terms of a set P of points, a set L of lines, and an incidence relation I that determines which points lie on which lines. As P and L are only sets one can interchange their roles and define a plane dual structure.

By interchanging the role of "points" and "lines" in

C = (P, L, I)

we obtain the dual structure

C* = (L, P, I*),

where I* is the converse relation of I.

In a projective plane a statement involving points, lines and incidence between them that is obtained from another such statement by interchanging the words "point" and "line" and making whatever grammatical adjustments that are necessary, is called the plane dual statement of the first. The plane dual statement of "Two points are on a unique line." is "Two lines meet at a unique point." Forming the plane dual of a statement is known as dualizing the statement.

If a statement is true in a projective plane C, then the plane dual of that statement must be true in the dual plane C*. This follows since dualizing each statement in the proof "in C" gives a statement of the proof "in C*."

In the projective plane C, it can be shown that there exist four lines, no three of which are concurrent. Dualizing this theorem and the first two axioms in the definition of a projective plane shows that the plane dual structure C* is also a projective plane, called the dual plane of C.

If C and C* are isomorphic, then C is called self-dual. The projective planes PG(2, K) for any division ring K are self-dual. However, there are non-Desarguesian planes which are not self-dual, such as the Hall planes and some that are, such as the Hughes planes.

The Principle of plane duality says that dualizing any theorem in a self-dual projective plane C produces another theorem valid in C.

== Correlations ==
A duality is a map from a projective plane C = (P, L, I) to its dual plane C* = (L, P, I*) (see above) which preserves incidence. That is, a duality σ will map points to lines and lines to points (P^{σ} = L and L^{σ} = P) in such a way that if a point Q is on a line m (denoted by Q I m) then Q^{σ} I* m^{σ} ⇔ m^{σ} I Q^{σ}. A duality which is an isomorphism is called a correlation. If a correlation exists then the projective plane C is self-dual.

In the special case that the projective plane is of the PG(2, K) type, with K a division ring, a duality is called a reciprocity. These planes are always self-dual. By the fundamental theorem of projective geometry a reciprocity is the composition of an automorphic function of K and a homography. If the automorphism involved is the identity, then the reciprocity is called a projective correlation.

A correlation of order two (an involution) is called a polarity. If a correlation φ is not a polarity then φ^{2} is a nontrivial collineation.

== Finite projective planes ==
Graph of the projective plane of order 7, having 57 points, 57 lines, 8 points on each line and 8 lines passing through each point, where each point is denoted by a rounded rectangle and each line by a combination of letter and number. Only lines with letter A and H are drawn. In the Dobble or Spot It! game, two points are removed. In the SVG file, hover over a line to highlight it.

It can be shown that a projective plane has the same number of lines as it has points (infinite or finite). Thus, for every finite projective plane there is an integer N ≥ 2 such that the plane has

N^{2} + N + 1 points,
N^{2} + N + 1 lines,
N + 1 points on each line, and
N + 1 lines through each point.

The number N is called the order of the projective plane.

The projective plane of order 2 is called the Fano plane. See also the article on finite geometry.

Using the vector space construction with finite fields there exists a projective plane of order N = p^{n}, for each prime power p^{n}. In fact, for all known finite projective planes, the order N is a prime power.

The existence of finite projective planes of other orders is an open question. The only general restriction known on the order is the Bruck–Ryser–Chowla theorem that if the order N is congruent to 1 or 2 mod 4, it must be the sum of two squares. This rules out N = 6. The next case N = 10 has been ruled out by massive computer calculations. Nothing more is known; in particular, the question of whether there exists a finite projective plane of order N = 12 is still open.

Another longstanding open problem is whether there exist finite projective planes of prime order which are not finite field planes (equivalently, whether there exists a non-Desarguesian projective plane of prime order).

A projective plane of order N is a Steiner S(2, N + 1, N^{2} + N + 1) system (see Steiner system). Conversely, one can prove that all Steiner systems of this form (λ = 2) are projective planes.

The number of mutually orthogonal Latin squares of order N is at most N − 1. N − 1 exist if and only if there is a projective plane of order N.

To determine the number of collineations of the projective plane PG(2,k) with k=p^{m}, first note that an invertible 3 × 3 matrix over GF(k) is determined by the image of a basis under multiplication. There are $k^3-1$ choices for the non-zero image of the first basis vector, $k^3-k$ choices for the image of the second basis vector that are linearly independent of the first image, and $k^3-k^2$ choices for the image of the third basis vector that are linearly independent of the first two images. Thus, there are $\left(k^3-1\right)\left(k^3-k\right)\left(k^3-k^2\right)$ different invertible matrices – but $k-1$ of them are multiples of each other and thus represent the same homography, so there are

$$\frac{\left(k^3-1\right)\left(k^3-k\right)\left(k^3-k^2\right)}{k-1}=\left(k^2+k+1\right)(k+1)k^3(k-1)^2$$

different homographies. Every collineation is the product of a homography and an automorphism of GF(p^{m}), and there are m such automorphisms, so there are $m\left(k^2+k+1\right)(k+1)k^3(k-1)^2$ different collineations.

While the classification of all projective planes is far from complete, results are known for small orders:

- 2 : all isomorphic to PG(2, 2), configuration (7_{3}) with 168 collineations
- 3 : all isomorphic to PG(2, 3), configuration (13_{4}) with 5616 collineations
- 4 : all isomorphic to PG(2, 4), configuration (21_{5}) with 120,960 collineations
- 5 : all isomorphic to PG(2, 5), configuration (31_{6}) with 372,000 collineations
- 6 : impossible as the order of a projective plane, proved by Tarry who showed that Euler's thirty-six officers problem has no solution. However, the connection between these problems was not known until Bose proved it in 1938.
- 7 : all isomorphic to PG(2, 7), configuration (57_{8}) with 5,630,688 collineations
- 8 : all isomorphic to PG(2, 8), configuration (73_{9}) with 32,965,632 collineations
- 9 : PG(2, 9), and three more different (non-isomorphic) non-Desarguesian planes: a Hughes plane, a Hall plane, and the dual of this Hall plane. All are described in (Room & Kirkpatrick 1971).
- 10 : impossible as an order of a projective plane, proved by heavy computer calculation.
- 11 : at least PG(2, 11), configuration (133_{12}) with 212,427,600 collineations; others are not known but possible.
- 12 : conjectured to be impossible as an order of a projective plane.

== Projective planes in higher-dimensional projective spaces ==
Projective planes may be thought of as projective geometries of dimension two. Higher-dimensional projective geometries can be defined in terms of incidence relations in a manner analogous to the definition of a projective plane.

The smallest projective space of dimension 3 is PG(3,2).

These turn out to be "tamer" than the projective planes since the extra degrees of freedom permit Desargues' theorem to be proved geometrically in the higher-dimensional geometry. This means that the coordinate "ring" associated to the geometry must be a division ring (skewfield) K, and the projective geometry is isomorphic to the one constructed from the vector space K^{d+1}, i.e. PG(d, K). As in the construction given earlier, the points of the d-dimensional projective space PG(d, K) are the lines through the origin in K^{d+1} and a line in PG(d, K) corresponds to a plane through the origin in K^{d+1}. In fact, each i-dimensional object in PG(d, K), with i < d, is an (i + 1)-dimensional (algebraic) vector subspace of K^{d+1} ("goes through the origin"). The projective spaces in turn generalize to the Grassmannian spaces.

It can be shown that if Desargues' theorem holds in a projective space of dimension greater than two, then it must also hold in all planes that are contained in that space. Since there are projective planes in which Desargues' theorem fails (non-Desarguesian planes), these planes can not be embedded in a higher-dimensional projective space. Only the planes from the vector space construction PG(2, K) can appear in projective spaces of higher dimension. Some disciplines in mathematics restrict the meaning of projective plane to only this type of projective plane since otherwise general statements about projective spaces would always have to mention the exceptions when the geometric dimension is two.

== See also ==
- Block design – a generalization of a finite projective plane.
- Combinatorial design
- Difference set
- Incidence structure
- Generalized polygon
- Projective geometry
- Non-Desarguesian plane
- Smooth projective plane
- Transversals in finite projective planes
- Truncated projective plane – a projective plane with one vertex removed.
- VC dimension of a finite projective plane
