= Topological geometry =

Topological geometry deals with incidence structures consisting of a point set $P$ and a family $\mathfrak{L}$ of subsets of $P$ called lines or circles etc. such that both $P$ and $\mathfrak{L}$ carry a topology and all geometric operations like joining points by a line or intersecting lines are continuous. As in the case of topological groups, many deeper results require the point space to be (locally) compact and connected. This generalizes the observation that the line joining two distinct points in the Euclidean plane depends continuously on the pair of points and the intersection point of two lines is a continuous function of these lines.

== Linear geometries ==
Linear geometries are incidence structures in which any two distinct points $x$ and $y$ are joined by a unique line $xy$. Such geometries are called topological if $xy$ depends continuously on the pair $(x,y)$ with respect to given topologies on the point set and the line set. The dual of a linear geometry is obtained by interchanging the roles of points and lines. A survey of linear topological geometries is given in Chapter 23 of the Handbook of incidence geometry. The most extensively investigated topological linear geometries are those which are also dual topological linear geometries. Such geometries are known as topological projective planes.

== History ==
A systematic study of these planes began in 1954 with a paper by Skornyakov. Earlier, the topological properties of the real plane had been introduced via ordering relations on the affine lines, see, e.g., Hilbert, Coxeter, and O. Wyler. The completeness of the ordering is equivalent to local compactness and implies that the affine lines are homeomorphic to $\R$ and that the point space is connected. Note that the rational numbers do not suffice to describe our intuitive notions of plane geometry and that some extension of the rational field is necessary. In fact, the equation $x^2 + y^2 = 3$ for a circle has no rational solution.

== Topological projective planes ==
The approach to the topological properties of projective planes via ordering relations is not possible, however, for the planes coordinatized by the complex numbers, the quaternions or the octonion algebra. The point spaces as well as the line spaces of these classical planes (over the real numbers, the complex numbers, the quaternions, and the octonions) are compact manifolds of dimension $2^m,\, 1 \le m \le 4$.

=== Topological dimension ===
The notion of the dimension of a topological space plays a prominent rôle in the study of topological, in particular of compact connected planes. For a normal space $X$, the dimension $\dim X$ can be characterized as follows:

If $\mathbb{S}_n$ denotes the $n$-sphere, then $\dim X \le n$ if, and only if, for every closed subspace $A \subset X$ each continuous map $\varphi : A \to \mathbb{S}_n$ has a continuous extension $\psi : X \to \mathbb{S}_n$.

For details and other definitions of a dimension see and the references given there, in particular Engelking or Fedorchuk.

=== 2-dimensional planes ===
The lines of a compact topological plane with a 2-dimensional point space form a family of curves homeomorphic to a circle, and this fact characterizes these planes among the topological projective planes. Equivalently, the point space is a surface. Early examples not isomorphic to the classical real plane ${\mathcal E}$ have been given by Hilbert and Moulton. The continuity properties of these examples have not been considered explicitly at that time, they may have been taken for granted. Hilbert’s construction can be modified to obtain uncountably many pairwise non-isomorphic $2$-dimensional compact planes. The traditional way to distinguish ${\mathcal E}$ from the other $2$-dimensional planes is by the validity of Desargues’s theorem or the theorem of Pappos (see, e.g., Pickert for a discussion of these two configuration theorems). The latter is known to imply the former (Hessenberg). The theorem of Desargues expresses a kind of homogeneity of the plane. In general, it holds in a projective plane if, and only if, the plane can be coordinatized by a (not necessarily commutative) field, hence it implies that the group of automorphisms is transitive on the set of quadrangles ($4$ points no $3$ of which are collinear). In the present setting, a much weaker homogeneity condition characterizes ${\mathcal E}$:

Theorem. If the automorphism group $\Sigma$ of a $2$-dimensional compact plane ${\mathcal P}$ is transitive on the point set (or the line set), then $\Sigma$ has a compact subgroup $\Phi$ which is even transitive on the set of flags (=incident point-line pairs), and ${\mathcal P}$ is classical.

The automorphism group $\Sigma = \operatorname{Aut}{\mathcal P}$ of a $2$-dimensional compact plane ${\mathcal P}$, taken with the topology of uniform convergence on the point space, is a locally compact group of dimension at most $8$, in fact even a Lie group. All $2$-dimensional planes such that $\dim\Sigma \ge 3$ can be described explicitly; those with $\dim\Sigma = 4$ are exactly the Moulton planes, the classical plane ${\mathcal E}$ is the only $2$-dimensional plane with $\dim \Sigma > 4$; see also.

=== Compact connected planes ===
The results on $2$-dimensional planes have been extended to compact planes of dimension $>2$. This is possible due to the following basic theorem:

Topology of compact planes. If the dimension of the point space $P$ of a compact connected projective plane is finite, then $\dim P=2^m$ with $m \in \{1,2,3,4\}$. Moreover, each line is a homotopy sphere of dimension $2^{m-1}$, see or.

Special aspects of 4-dimensional planes are treated in, more recent results can be found in. The lines of a $4$-dimensional compact plane are homeomorphic to the $2$-sphere; in the cases $m>2$ the lines are not known to be manifolds, but in all examples which have been found so far the lines are spheres. A subplane ${\mathcal B}$ of a projective plane ${\mathcal P}$ is said to be a Baer subplane, if each point of ${\mathcal P}$ is incident with a line of ${\mathcal B}$ and each line of ${\mathcal P}$ contains a point of ${\mathcal B}$. A closed subplane ${\mathcal B}$ is a Baer subplane of a compact connected plane ${\mathcal P}$ if, and only if, the point space of ${\mathcal B}$ and a line of ${\mathcal P}$ have the same dimension. Hence the lines of an 8-dimensional plane $\mathcal P$ are homeomorphic to a sphere $\mathbb{S}_4$ if ${\mathcal P}$ has a closed Baer subplane.

Homogeneous planes. If $\mathcal P$ is a compact connected projective plane and if $\Sigma = \operatorname{Aut}{\mathcal P}$ is transitive on the point set of $\mathcal P$, then $\Sigma$ has a flag-transitive compact subgroup $\Phi$ and $\mathcal P$ is classical, see or. In fact, $\Phi$ is an elliptic motion group.

Let $\mathcal P$ be a compact plane of dimension $2^m,\; m=2,3,4$, and write $\Sigma = \operatorname{Aut}{\mathcal P}$. If $\dim\Sigma > 8,18,40$, then ${\mathcal P}$ is classical, and $\operatorname{Aut}{\mathcal P}$ is a simple Lie group of dimension $16,35,78$ respectively. All planes $\mathcal P$ with $\dim\Sigma = 8,18,40$ are known explicitly. The planes with $\dim\Sigma = 40$ are exactly the projective closures of the affine planes coordinatized by a so-called mutation $(\mathbb{O},+,\circ)$ of the octonion algebra $(\mathbb{O},+, \ \,)$, where the new multiplication $\circ$ is defined as follows: choose a real number $t$ with $1/2 < t \ne 1$ and put $a \circ b = t\cdot a b + (1-t)\cdot b a$. Vast families of planes with a group of large dimension have been discovered systematically starting from assumptions about their automorphism groups, see, e.g.,. Many of them are projective closures of translation planes (affine planes admitting a sharply transitive group of automorphisms mapping each line to a parallel), cf.; see also for more recent results in the case $m=3$ and for $m=4$.

== Compact projective spaces ==
Subplanes of projective spaces of geometrical dimension at least 3 are necessarily Desarguesian, see §1 or §16 or. Therefore, all compact connected projective spaces can be coordinatized by the real or complex numbers or the quaternion field.

== Stable planes ==
The classical non-euclidean hyperbolic plane can be represented by the intersections of the straight lines in the real plane with an open circular disk. More generally, open (convex) parts of the classical affine planes are typical stable planes. A survey of these geometries can be found in, for the $2$-dimensional case see also.

Precisely, a stable plane ${\mathcal S}$ is a topological linear geometry $(P,\mathfrak{L})$ such that

1. $P$ is a locally compact space of positive finite dimension,
2. each line $L\in\mathfrak{L}$ is a closed subset of $P$, and $\mathfrak{L}$ is a Hausdorff space,
3. the set $\{(K,L) \mid K \ne L,\;K \cap L \ne \emptyset\}$ is an open subspace $\mathfrak{O} \subset \mathfrak{L}^2$ ( stability),
4. the map $(K,L) \mapsto K \cap L:\mathfrak{O} \to P$ is continuous.

Note that stability excludes geometries like the $3$-dimensional affine space over $\R$ or $\Complex$.

A stable plane ${\mathcal S}$ is a projective plane if, and only if, $P$ is compact.

As in the case of projective planes, line pencils are compact and homotopy equivalent to a sphere of dimension $2^{m-1}$, and $\dim P = 2^m$ with $m\in\{1,2,3,4\}$, see or. Moreover, the point space $P$ is locally contractible.

'Compact groups of (proper) stable planes are rather small. Let $\Phi_d$ denote a maximal compact subgroup of the automorphism group of the classical $d$-dimensional projective plane ${\mathcal P}_d$. Then the following theorem holds:
If a $d$-dimensional stable plane ${\mathcal S}$ admits a compact group $\Gamma$ of automorphisms such that $\dim\Gamma > \dim\Phi_d-d$, then ${\mathcal S} \cong {\mathcal P}_d$, see.

Flag-homogeneous stable planes. Let ${\mathcal S}=(P,\mathfrak{L})$ be a stable plane. If the automorphism group $\operatorname{Aut}{\mathcal S}$ is flag-transitive, then ${\mathcal S}$ is a classical projective or affine plane, or ${\mathcal S}$ is isomorphic to the interior of the absolute sphere of the hyperbolic polarity of a classical plane; see.

In contrast to the projective case, there is an abundance of point-homogeneous stable planes, among them vast classes of translation planes, see and.

== Symmetric planes ==
Affine translation planes have the following property:

- There exists a point transitive closed subgroup $\Delta$ of the automorphism group which contains a unique reflection at some and hence at each point.

More generally, a symmetric plane is a stable plane ${\mathcal S} = (P,\mathfrak{L})$ satisfying the aforementioned condition; see, cf. for a survey of these geometries. By Corollary 5.5, the group $\Delta$ is a Lie group and the point space $P$ is a manifold. It follows that ${\mathcal S}$ is a symmetric space. By means of the Lie theory of symmetric spaces, all symmetric planes with a point set of dimension $2$ or $4$ have been classified. They are either translation planes or they are determined by a Hermitian form. An easy example is the real hyperbolic plane.

== Circle geometries ==
Classical models are given by the plane sections of a quadratic surface $S$ in real projective $3$-space; if $S$ is a sphere, the geometry is called a Möbius plane. The plane sections of a ruled surface (one-sheeted hyperboloid) yield the classical Minkowski plane, cf. for generalizations. If $S$ is an elliptic cone without its vertex, the geometry is called a Laguerre plane. Collectively these planes are sometimes referred to as Benz planes. A topological Benz plane is classical, if each point has a neighbourhood which is isomorphic to some open piece of the corresponding classical Benz plane.

=== Möbius planes ===
Möbius planes consist of a family $\mathfrak{C}$ of circles, which are topological 1-spheres, on the $2$-sphere $S$ such that for each point $p$ the derived structure $(S\setminus\{p\},\{C\setminus\{p\}\mid p\in C\in\mathfrak{C}\})$ is a topological affine plane. In particular, any $3$ distinct points are joined by a unique circle. The circle space $\mathfrak{C}$ is then homeomorphic to real projective $3$-space with one point deleted. A large class of examples is given by the plane sections of an egg-like surface in real $3$-space.

=== Homogeneous Möbius planes ===
If the automorphism group $\Sigma$ of a Möbius plane is transitive on the point set $S$ or on the set $\mathfrak{C}$ of circles, or if $\dim\Sigma \ge 4$, then $(S,\mathfrak{C})$ is classical and $\dim\Sigma = 6$, see.

In contrast to compact projective planes there are no topological Möbius planes with circles of dimension $>1$, in particular no compact Möbius planes with a $4$-dimensional point space. All 2-dimensional Möbius planes such that $\dim\Sigma \ge 3$ can be described explicitly.

=== Laguerre planes ===
The classical model of a Laguerre plane consists of a circular cylindrical surface $C$ in real $3$-space $\R^3$ as point set and the compact plane sections of $C$ as circles. Pairs of points which are not joined by a circle are called parallel. Let $P$ denote a class of parallel points. Then $C \setminus P$ is a plane $\R^2$, the circles can be represented in this plane by parabolas of the form $y = ax^2+bx+c$.

In an analogous way, the classical $4$-dimensional Laguerre plane is related to the geometry of complex quadratic polynomials. In general, the axioms of a locally compact connected Laguerre plane require that the derived planes embed into compact projective planes of finite dimension. A circle not passing through the point of derivation induces an oval in the derived projective plane. By or, circles are homeomorphic to spheres of dimension $1$ or $2$. Hence the point space of a locally compact connected Laguerre plane is homeomorphic to the cylinder $C$ or it is a $4$-dimensional manifold, cf. A large class of $2$-dimensional examples, called ovoidal Laguerre planes, is given by the plane sections of a cylinder in real 3-space whose base is an oval in $\R^2$.

The automorphism group of a $2d$-dimensional Laguerre plane ($d = 1, 2$) is a Lie group with respect to the topology of uniform convergence on compact subsets of the point space; furthermore, this group has dimension at most $7d$. All automorphisms of a Laguerre plane which fix each parallel class form a normal subgroup, the kernel of the full automorphism group. The $2$-dimensional Laguerre planes with $\dim\Sigma=5$ are exactly the ovoidal planes over proper skew parabolae. The classical $2d$-dimensional Laguerre planes are the only ones such that $\dim\Sigma > 5d$, see, cf. also.

=== Homogeneous Laguerre planes ===
If the automorphism group $\Sigma$ of a $2d$-dimensional Laguerre plane ${\mathcal L}$ is transitive on the set of parallel classes, and if the kernel $T \triangleleft \Sigma$ is transitive on the set of circles, then ${\mathcal L}$ is classical, see 2.1,2.

However, transitivity of the automorphism group on the set of circles does not suffice to characterize the classical model among the $2d$-dimensional Laguerre planes.

=== Minkowski planes ===
The classical model of a Minkowski plane has the torus $\mathbb{S}_1 \times \mathbb{S}_1$ as point space, circles are the graphs of real fractional linear maps on $\mathbb{S}_1 = \R \cup\{\infty\}$. As with Laguerre planes, the point space of a locally compact connected Minkowski plane is $1$- or $2$-dimensional; the point space is then homeomorphic to a torus or to $\mathbb{S}_2 \times \mathbb{S}_2$, see.

=== Homogeneous Minkowski planes ===
If the automorphism group $\Sigma$ of a Minkowski plane ${\mathcal M}$ of dimension $2d$ is flag-transitive, then ${\mathcal M}$ is classical.

The automorphism group of a $2d$-dimensional Minkowski plane is a Lie group of dimension at most $6d$. All $2$-dimensional Minkowski planes such that $\dim\Sigma \ge 4$ can be described explicitly. The classical $2d$-dimensional Minkowski plane is the only one with $\dim\Sigma > 4d$, see.
