= Bundle theorem =

In Euclidean geometry, the bundle theorem is a statement about six circles and eight points in the Euclidean plane. In general incidence geometry, it is a similar property that a Möbius plane may or may not satisfy. According to Kahn's Theorem, it is fulfilled by "ovoidal" Möbius planes only; thus, it is the analog for Möbius planes of Desargues' Theorem for projective planes.

The property of the bundle theorem is that the dashed red cycle exists.

== Description ==
If for eight different points $A_1,A_2,A_3,A_4, B_1,B_2,B_3,B_4$ five of the six quadruples $Q_{ij}:=\{A_i,B_i,A_j,B_j\}, \ i<j,$ are concyclic (contained in a cycle) on at least four cycles $c_{ij}$, then the sixth quadruple is also concyclic.

The bundle theorem should not be confused with Miquel's theorem (though it is derivable from taking a circle inversion on the diagram of the Miquel point of a complete quadrilateral).

An ovoidal Möbius plane in real Euclidean space may be considered as the geometry of the plane sections of an egglike surface, like a sphere, or an ellipsoid, or half a sphere glued to a suitable half of an ellipsoid, or the surface with equation $x^4+y^4+z^4=1$, etc. If the egglike surface is a sphere one gets the space model of the classical real Möbius plane, which is the "circle geometry" on the sphere.

The essential property of an ovoidal Möbius plane is the existence of a space model via an ovoid. An ovoid in a 3-dimensional projective space is a set of points, which a) is intersected by lines in 0, 1, or 2 points and b) its tangents at an arbitrary point covers a plane (tangent plane). The geometry of an ovoid in projective 3-space is a Möbius plane, called an ovoidal Möbius plane. The point set of the geometry consists of the points of the ovoid and the curves ("cycles") are the plane sections of the ovoid. A suitable stereographical projection shows that for any ovoidal Möbius plane there exists a plane model. In the classical case the plane model is the geometry of the circles and lines (where each line is completed by a point at infinity). The bundle theorem has a planar and a spatial interpretation. In the planar model there may be lines involved. The proof of the bundle theorem is performed within the spatial model.

=== Theorem ===
The bundle theorem holds in every ovoidal Möbius plane.

The proof is a consequence of the following considerations, which use essentially the fact that three planes in a 3-dimensional projective space intersect in a single point:

1. The planes containing the cycles $c_{23},c_{34},c_{24}$ intersect in a point $P$. Hence $P$ is the intersection point of the lines (in space !) $A_2B_2,\ A_4B_4$.
2. The planes containing the cycles $c_{12},c_{14},c_{24}$ intersect in a point $P'$. Hence $P'$ is the intersection point of the lines $A_2B_2,\ A_4B_4$, too.

This yields: a) $P=P'$ and b) $A_1B_1,\ A_3B_3$ intersect at point $P$, too. The last statement means: $A_1,B_1,A_3,B_3$ are concyclic. The planes involved have point $P$ in common, they are elements of a bundle of planes.

The importance of the bundle theorem was shown by Jeff Kahn.

== Theorem of Kahn ==
A Möbius plane is ovoidal if and only if it fulfills the bundle theorem.

The bundle theorem is analogous for Möbius planes to the Theorem of Desargues for projective planes. From the bundle theorem follows the existence of a) a skewfield (division ring) and b) an ovoid. If the more strict theorem of Miquel holds, the skewfield is even commutative (field) and the ovoid is a quadric.

There are Möbius planes, which are not ovoidal.

For ovoidal Laguerre planes there exists a bundle theorem with an analogous meaning.

== Sources ==
- Hartmann, Erich. Planar Circle Geometries, an Introduction to Möbius-, Laguerre- and Minkowski Planes. (PDF; 891 kB) Department of Mathematics, Darmstadt University of Technology
- Kahn, Jeff. Inversive planes satisfying the bundle theorem. Journal of Combinatorial Theory, Series A, Volume 29, Issue 1, pp. 1-19, July 1980. doi:10.1016/0097-3165(80)90043-6
