= Ovoid (projective geometry) =

Sphere-like surface

To the definition of an ovoid: t tangent, s secant line

In projective geometry an ovoid is a sphere like pointset (surface) in a projective space of dimension d ≥ 3. Simple examples in a real projective space are hyperspheres (quadrics). The essential geometric properties of an ovoid $\mathcal O$ are:

1. Any line intersects $\mathcal O$ in at most 2 points,
2. The tangents at a point cover a hyperplane (and nothing more), and
3. $\mathcal O$ contains no lines.

Property 2) excludes degenerated cases (cones,...). Property 3) excludes ruled surfaces (hyperboloids of one sheet, ...).

An ovoid is the spatial analog of an oval in a projective plane.

An ovoid is a special type of a quadratic set.

Ovoids play an essential role in constructing examples of Möbius planes and higher dimensional Möbius geometries.

== Definition of an ovoid ==
- In a projective space of dimension d ≥ 3 a set $\mathcal O$ of points is called an ovoid, if

(1) Any line g meets $\mathcal O$ in at most 2 points.

In the case of $|g\cap\mathcal O|=0$, the line is called a passing (or exterior) line, if $|g\cap\mathcal O|=1$ the line is a tangent line, and if $|g\cap\mathcal O|=2$ the line is a secant line.

(2) At any point $P \in \mathcal O$ the tangent lines through P cover a hyperplane, the tangent hyperplane, (i.e., a projective subspace of dimension d − 1).
(3) $\mathcal O$ contains no lines.

From the viewpoint of the hyperplane sections, an ovoid is a rather homogeneous object, because

- For an ovoid $\mathcal O$ and a hyperplane $\varepsilon$, which contains at least two points of $\mathcal O$, the subset $\varepsilon \cap \mathcal O$ is an ovoid (or an oval, if d = 3) within the hyperplane $\varepsilon$.

For finite projective spaces of dimension d ≥ 3 (i.e., the point set is finite, the space is pappian), the following result is true:

- If $\mathcal O$ is an ovoid in a finite projective space of dimension d ≥ 3, then d = 3.

(In the finite case, ovoids exist only in 3-dimensional spaces.)

- In a finite projective space of order n >2 (i.e. any line contains exactly n + 1 points) and dimension d = 3 any pointset $\mathcal O$ is an ovoid if and only if $|\mathcal O|=n^2+1$ and no three points are collinear (on a common line).

Replacing the word projective in the definition of an ovoid by affine, gives the definition of an affine ovoid.

If for an (projective) ovoid there is a suitable hyperplane $\varepsilon$ not intersecting it, one can call this hyperplane the hyperplane $\varepsilon_\infty$ at infinity and the ovoid becomes an affine ovoid in the affine space corresponding to $\varepsilon_\infty$. Also, any affine ovoid can be considered a projective ovoid in the projective closure (adding a hyperplane at infinity) of the affine space.

== Examples ==
=== In real projective space (inhomogeneous representation) ===
1. $\mathcal O=\{(x_1,...,x_d)\in {\mathbb R}^d \; |\; x_1^2+\cdots +x_d^2=1\}\ ,$ (hypersphere)
2. $\mathcal O=\{(x_1,...,x_d)\in {\mathbb R}^d \; | x_d=x_1^2+\cdots +x_{d-1}^2\; \} \; \cup \; \{\text{point at infinity of } x_d\text{-axis}\}$

These two examples are quadrics and are projectively equivalent.

Simple examples, which are not quadrics can be obtained by the following constructions:

(a) Glue one half of a hypersphere to a suitable hyperellipsoid in a smooth way.
(b) In the first two examples replace the expression x_{1}^{2} by x_{1}^{4}.

Remark: The real examples can not be converted into the complex case (projective space over ${\mathbb C}$). In a complex projective space of dimension d ≥ 3 there are no ovoidal quadrics, because in that case any non degenerated quadric contains lines.

But the following method guarantees many non quadric ovoids:

- For any non-finite projective space the existence of ovoids can be proven using transfinite induction.

=== Finite examples ===
- Any ovoid $\mathcal O$ in a finite projective space of dimension d = 3 over a field K of characteristic ≠ 2 is a quadric.

The last result can not be extended to even characteristic, because of the following non-quadric examples:

- For $K=GF(2^m),\; m$ odd and $\sigma$ the automorphism $x \mapsto x^{(2^{\frac{m+1}{2}})}\; ,$

the pointset

$\mathcal O=\{(x,y,z)\in K^3 \; |\; z=xy+x^2x^\sigma+y^\sigma \} \; \cup \; \{\text{point of infinity of the } z\text{-axis}\}$ is an ovoid in the 3-dimensional projective space over K (represented in inhomogeneous coordinates).
Only when m = 1 is the ovoid $\mathcal O$ a quadric.
$\mathcal O$ is called the Tits-Suzuki-ovoid.

== Criteria for an ovoid to be a quadric ==
An ovoidal quadric has many symmetries. In particular:

- Let be $\mathcal O$ an ovoid in a projective space $\mathfrak P$ of dimension d ≥ 3 and $\varepsilon$ a hyperplane. If the ovoid is symmetric to any point $P \in \varepsilon \setminus \mathcal O$ (i.e. there is an involutory perspectivity with center $P$ which leaves $\mathcal O$ invariant), then $\mathfrak P$ is pappian and $\mathcal O$ a quadric.
- An ovoid $\mathcal O$ in a projective space $\mathfrak P$ is a quadric, if the group of projectivities, which leave $\mathcal O$ invariant operates 3-transitively on $\mathcal O$, i.e. for two triples $A_1,A_2,A_3,\; B_1,B_2,B_3$ there exists a projectivity $\pi$ with $\pi(A_i)=B_i,\; i=1,2,3$.

In the finite case one gets from Segre's theorem:

- Let be $\mathcal O$ an ovoid in a finite 3-dimensional desarguesian projective space $\mathfrak P$ of odd order, then $\mathfrak P$ is pappian and $\mathcal O$ is a quadric.

== Generalization: semi ovoid ==
Removing condition (1) from the definition of an ovoid results in the definition of a semi-ovoid:

A point set $\mathcal O$ of a projective space is called a semi-ovoid if

the following conditions hold:

(SO1) For any point $P \in \mathcal O$ the tangents through point $P$ exactly cover a hyperplane.
(SO2) $\mathcal O$ contains no lines.

A semi ovoid is a special semi-quadratic set which is a generalization of a quadratic set. The essential difference between a semi-quadratic set and a quadratic set is the fact, that there can be lines which have 3 points in common with the set and the lines are not contained in the set.

Examples of semi-ovoids are the sets of isotropic points of an hermitian form. They are called hermitian quadrics.

As for ovoids in literature there are criteria, which make a semi-ovoid to a hermitian quadric. See, for example.

Semi-ovoids are used in the construction of examples of Möbius geometries.

== See also ==
- Ovoid (polar space)
- Möbius plane
