= Kahn–Kalai conjecture =

Mathematical proposition

The Kahn–Kalai conjecture, also known as the expectation threshold conjecture or more recently the Park-Pham Theorem, was a conjecture in the field of graph theory and statistical mechanics, proposed by Jeff Kahn and Gil Kalai in 2006. It was proven in a paper published in 2024.

== Background ==
This conjecture concerns the general problem of estimating when phase transitions occur in systems. For example, in a random network with $N$ nodes, where each edge is included with probability $p$, it is unlikely for the graph to contain a Hamiltonian cycle if $p$ is less than a threshold value $(\log N)/N$, but highly likely if $p$ exceeds that threshold.

Threshold values are often difficult to calculate, but a lower bound for the threshold, the "expectation threshold", is generally easier to calculate. The Kahn–Kalai conjecture is that the two values are generally close together in a precisely defined way, namely that there is a universal constant $K$ for which the ratio between the two is less than $K \log{l(\mathcal{F})}$ where $l(\mathcal{F})$ is the size of a largest minimal element of an increasing family $\mathcal{F}$ of subsets of a power set.

== Proof ==
Jinyoung Park and Huy Tuan Pham announced a proof of the conjecture in 2022; it was published in 2024.

== See also ==
- Percolation theory
