= Jinyoung Park (mathematician) =

Mathematician at Courant Institute of Mathematical Sciences

- 박진영
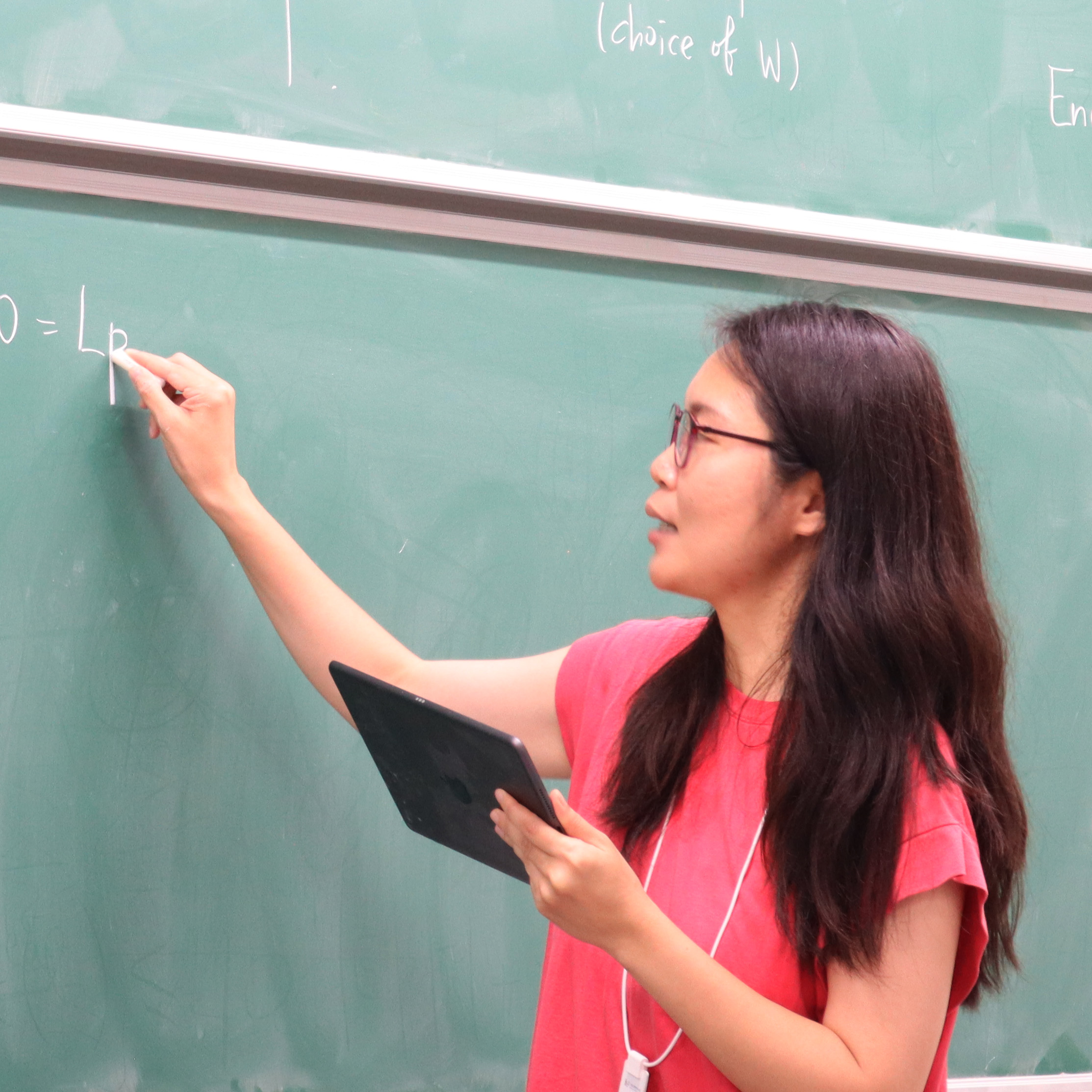
- Born: 1982 (age 43–44)
- Education: Rutgers University (PhD); Seoul National University (BS)
- Known for: Kahn–Kalai conjecture
- Scientific career
- Fields: Mathematics; Combinatorics; Graph theory
- Workplaces: Courant Institute of Mathematical Sciences; Stanford University; Institute for Advanced Study
- Academic advisors: Jeff Kahn
- Website: sites.google.com/view/jinyoungpark

- Korean name
- Hangul: 박진영
- RR: Bak Jinyeong
- MR: Pak Chinyŏng

Jinyoung Park (Korean: 박진영; born 1982) is a South Korean mathematician at the Courant Institute of Mathematical Sciences at New York University working in combinatorics and graph theory.

She and Huy Tuan Pham proved the Kahn–Kalai conjecture on estimating the positions of phase transitions in statistical mechanics and random graph theory.

== Education and career ==
Park entered Seoul National University in 2001 and received her B.S. in Mathematics Education in 2004. She worked as a mathematics teacher in secondary schools in Seoul from 2005 to 2011. She began her graduate studies at Rutgers University in 2014, where she received her Ph.D. in 2020 under the supervision of Jeff Kahn. Her doctoral work earned the 2022 Dissertation Prize from the Association for Women in Mathematics.

She was a Member of the Institute for Advanced Study from 2020 to 2021. From 2021 to 2022 she was a Szegö Assistant Professor at Stanford University, where her postdoctoral mentor was Jacob Fox. She joined the Courant Institute of Mathematical Sciences at New York University in 2023, where she is currently an assistant professor.

== Recognition ==
In 2023, Park received the Maryam Mirzakhani New Frontiers Prize "for contributions to the resolution of several major conjectures on thresholds and selector processes". In 2024, she received the Dénes König Prize together with her coauthor Huy Tuan Pham, "for their outstanding research in discrete mathematics, in special recognition of their ingenious, short, and surprising proof of the Kahn–Kalai conjecture". The following year, she was the 2025 recipient of the Levi L. Conant Prize, given for her article "Threshold phenomena for random discrete structures" in the Notices of the American Mathematical Society.

== Selected works ==
- Frankston, Keith; Kahn, Jeff; Narayanan, Bhargav; Park, Jinyoung (2021). "Thresholds versus fractional expectation-thresholds". Annals of Mathematics. Second Series. 194 (2): 475–495. arXiv:1910.13433. doi:10.4007/annals.2021.194.2.2. MR 4298747.
- Park, Jinyoung (2023). "Threshold phenomena for random discrete structures" (PDF). Notices of the American Mathematical Society. 70 (10): 1615–1625. arXiv:2306.13823. doi:10.1090/noti2802 (inactive 14 September 2025). MR 4658085.
- Park, Jinyoung; Pham, Huy Tuan (2024). "A proof of the Kahn–Kalai conjecture". Journal of the American Mathematical Society. 37 (1): 235–243. arXiv:2203.17207. doi:10.1090/jams/1028. MR 4654612.
