= Möbius geometry =

Subfield of conformal geometry

In mathematics, Möbius geometry is a branch of geometry — specifically a subfield of conformal geometry — which deals with the study of geometric objects in the extended complex plane. The field is named after the German mathematician August Ferdinand Möbius (1790–1868). Furthermore, it allows the study of planar geometries.

== Historical background ==
Möbius laid the foundations of this field, particularly through his mathematical work in 1827: Der barycentrische Calkul (“The Calculus of Centres of Gravity”). In this work, he introduced homogeneous coordinates — coordinates that can include a point at infinity — and addressed projective geometric transformations in particular. In 1858, he discovered the Möbius strip, a one-sided surface.

Around the first third of the 20th century, the Austrian mathematician Wilhelm Blaschke introduced another model, whose advantage lies in the embedding of the diffeomorphism group in the described $M(n)$ groups of linear mappings. This model further developed the field of Möbius geometry.

== Informal introduction ==
Informally, Möbius geometry is the study of geometric transformations turning hyperspheres back into hyperspheres. According to the Erlanger Programm, Möbius geometry describes the effect the Möbius group has on $S^n$.

== Applications ==
Möbius geometry has applications across different fields:

1. It has been used in computer graphics to compare two three-dimensional shapes by mapping them onto a sphere and defining correspondences between the two surfaces.
2. Möbius geometry also has applications in theoretical physics, particularly special relativity. When studying the relation between the Lorentz group and Möbius transformations, it was found that the laws of physics that rule space-time work exactly like the math of the Möbius group on the sky’s sphere, meaning that the visual bending of incoming light rays for a speeding observer is controlled completely by the rules of Möbius geometry.
3. In addition, Möbius geometry finds applications in architecture, since it enables the creation of subdivision surfaces that reproduce spheres, circular arcs, and other Möbius‑invariant geometric features, which are highly valuable in architectural design.
4. Moreover, it can be applied to engineering, such as aerospace and satellite communications. Here, Möbius transformation modules are used to expand 1D static strips into 2D linear and radial fields. The optical Möbius transformation (OMT) module can make the transformation from any single 1D scanning to 2D scanning possible.
5. One should also consider the application in mathematics, especially spherical geometry. Möbius transformations here have the ability to map specific points on a sphere, thus transforming vast circles back into great circles. This exact method is used in cartography as well, to display spherical parts onto a planar map.

== Definition ==
In Möbius geometry, one investigates certain invariant relationships between four distinct points, whereas in metric geometry, the focus lies on the distance between two points. Möbius geometry relies on the geometric and algebraic relationships formed by the pairings of these four points. From these four points, there are three distinct ways to partition them into pairs (e.g., grouping four points $z_1, z_2, z_3, z_4$ into pairs of two). We can call those three pairings (each made of two points) $A, B$ and $C$.

The subfield focuses on properties that remain invariant under Möbius transformations.

== Notations ==
Symbol	Meaning
$z$	complex variable
$a, b, c, d$	complex numbers as variables ($a, b, c, d$ $\in$ ℂ)
$r$	absolute value or modulus of the complex number $|z|$
$t$	angle or argument of the complex number
$A, B$	constants in inversion
$\mu$	Möbius transformation
$\psi$	stereographic projection
$u$	x‑coordinate of the unit sphere $S^2$
$v$	y‑coordinate of the unit sphere $S^2$
$w$	z‑coordinate of the unit sphere $S^2$

== Examples ==
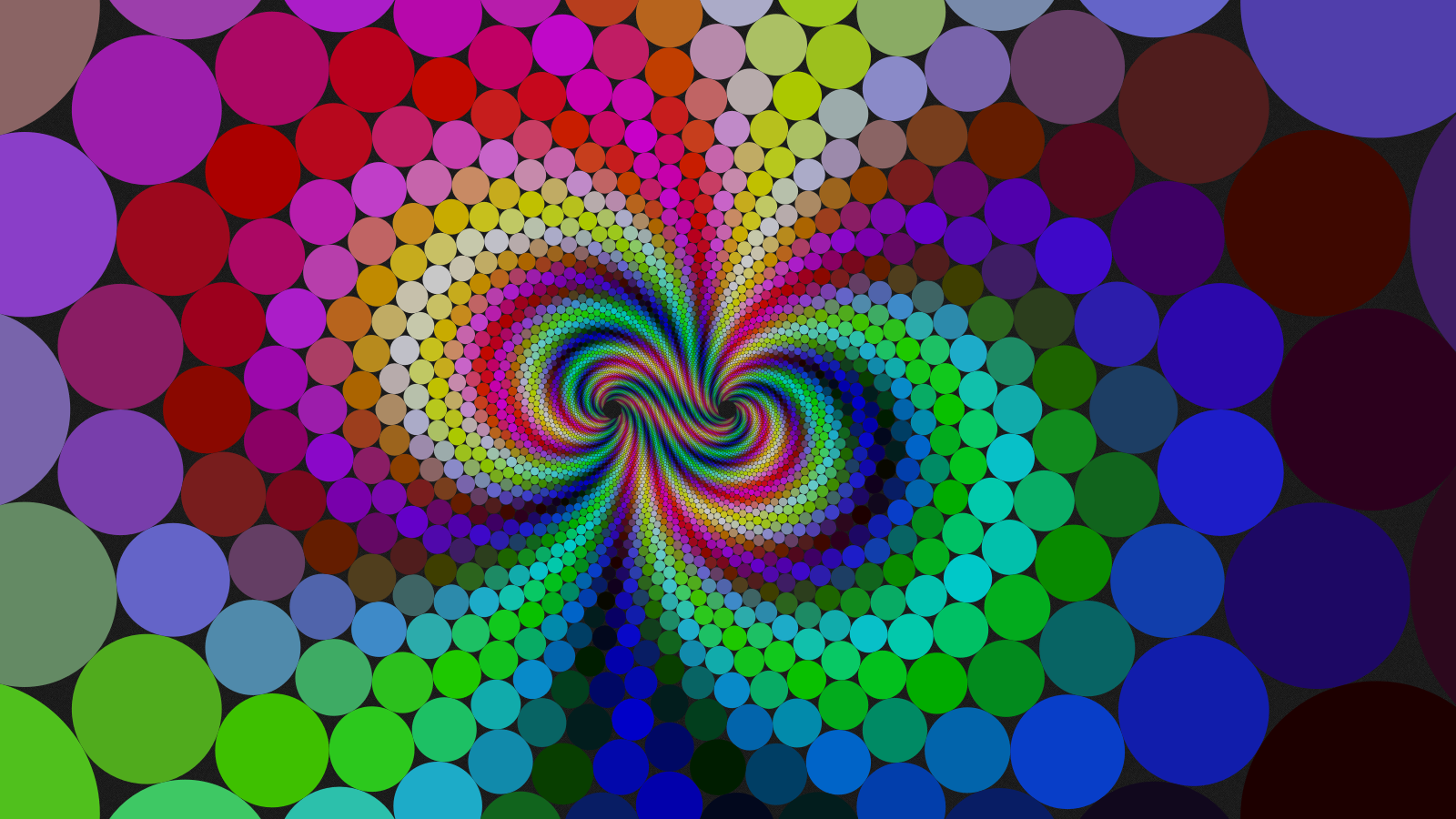
Loxodromic spiral circle packing via Möbius Transformation

=== Möbius transformation ===
A Möbius transformation is a mapping of the form

$T(z) := \frac{az + b}{cz + d}$.

The general rule is: $ad - bc \neq 0$.

Circle inversion

=== Inversion in a circle ===
Any Möbius transformation arises from a sequence of inversions in circles. The map $I(z) := 1/z$ is called an inversion. The map is defined on

$\mathbb{C}^* := \mathbb{C} \setminus \{0\}$.

Then, if and only if the circumstances below are fulfilled,

$z = re^{it} \neq 0$

the inversion $1/z = (1/(z\bar{z})) \cdot z = (1/r) \cdot e^{-it}$

is composed of the reflection on the unit circle

$re^{it} \mapsto \frac{1}{r} e^{it}$

and of the reflection on the abscissa axis. To now show that

$T(z) := \frac{az + b}{cz + d}$ with $c \neq 0$

is any Möbius transformation, one introduces $A$ and $B$. If now

$A := \frac{bc - ad}{c}$ and $B := \frac{a}{c}$, then

$A \cdot \frac{1}{cz + d} + B = \frac{a(cz + d) + (bc - ad)}{c(cz + d)}$

$= \frac{acz + ad + bc - ad}{c(cz + d)} = \frac{az + b}{cz + d} = T(z)$.

Therefore, $T$ is composed of inversion.

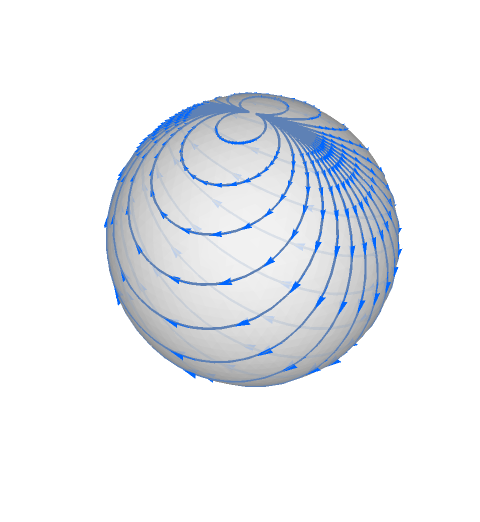
The Riemann sphere

=== Möbius transformation of the Riemann sphere ===
==== Riemann sphere ====
The Riemann sphere $\mathbb{P}^1$ is a one‑dimensional complex manifold that represents the extended complex plane, which may be defined as the set $\mathbb{C} \cup \{\infty\}$.

==== Möbius transformation of the Riemann sphere ====
Here, the Möbius transformation is denoted as

$\mu_{a,b,c,d}$: $\mathbb{P}^1 \longmapsto \mathbb{P}^1$.

It is defined as the function of the Riemann sphere $\mathbb{P}^1$ to itself, specified by the following features:

$\mu_{a,b,c,d}(z)$ $= \frac{az + b}{cz + d}$.

It is defined for all complex numbers $z$ such that

$cz + d \neq 0$; $\mu_{a,b,c,d}(-d/c) = \infty$ and $\mu_{a,b,c,d}(\infty) = a/c$ if $c \neq 0$; $\mu_{a,b,c,d}(\infty) = \infty$ if $c = 0$.

Stereographic projection

=== Stereographic projection ===
A stereographic projection is a geometric formulation. It causes a one‑to‑one relation between a complement of a fixed point $A$ on the sphere in three‑dimensional Euclidean space and some points of the plane $Z$ through the centre $C$ of the sphere perpendicular to the line segment $AC$.

First, one has the unit sphere $S^2$ in $\mathbb{R}^3$, defined in such a way that

$S^2 = \{(u, v, w) \in \mathbb{R}^3 : u^2 + v^2 + w^2 = 1\}$.

Now, let

$\psi : S^2 \setminus \{(0, 0, -1)\} \rightarrow \mathbb{R}^2$

be the stereographic projection mapping, determined so that

$\psi(u, v, w) = \left(\frac{u}{w + 1}, \frac{v}{w + 1}\right)$

for every point $(u, v, w)$ of $S^2$.

== See also ==
- Möbius transformation
- Möbius strip
- Möbius function
- Möbius plane
- Möbius inversion
