= Minkowski plane =

Type of Benz planes

In mathematics, a Minkowski plane (named after Hermann Minkowski) is one of the Benz planes (the others being Möbius plane and Laguerre plane).

== Classical real Minkowski plane ==
classical Minkowski plane: 2d/3d-model

Applying the pseudo-euclidean distance $d(P_1,P_2) = (x'_1-x'_2)^2 - (y'_1-y'_2)^2$ on two points $P_i = (x'_i, y'_i)$ (instead of the euclidean distance) we get the geometry of hyperbolas, because a pseudo-euclidean circle $\{P\in \R^2 \mid d(P,M)=r\}$ is a hyperbola with midpoint $M$.

By a transformation of coordinates $x_i = x'_i + y'_i$, $y_i = x'_i - y'_i$, the pseudo-euclidean distance can be rewritten as $d(P_1,P_2) = (x_1 - x_2) (y_1 - y_2)$. The hyperbolas then have asymptotes parallel to the non-primed coordinate axes.

The following completion (see Möbius and Laguerre planes) homogenizes the geometry of hyperbolas:

- the set of points: $\mathcal P := \left(\R \cup \left\{\infty\right\}\right)^2 = \R^2 \cup \left(\left\{\infty\right\} \times \R\right) \cup \left(\R \times \left\{\infty\right\}\right) \ \cup \left\{\left(\infty,\infty\right)\right\} \ , \ \infty \notin \R,$
- the set of cycles
  $$\begin{align}
\mathcal Z :={} & \left\{\left\{\left(x,y\right) \in \R^2 \mid y = ax + b\right\} \cup \left\{\left(\infty,\infty\right)\right\} \mid a,b \in \R, a\ne 0\right\}\\
& \quad \cup \left\{\left\{\left(x,y\right) \in \R^2 \mid y=\frac{a}{x-b} + c, x \ne b\right\}
\cup \left\{\left(b,\infty\right),\left(\infty,c\right)\right\} \mid a,b,c \in \R, a \ne 0\right\}.
\end{align}$$

The incidence structure $({\mathcal P},{\mathcal Z},\in)$ is called the classical real Minkowski plane.

The set of points consists of $\R^2$, two copies of $\R$ and the point $(\infty,\infty)$.

Any line $y=ax+b ,a\ne0$ is completed by point $(\infty,\infty)$, any hyperbola $y = \frac{a}{x-b} + c, a\ne0$ by the two points $(b,\infty),(\infty,c)$ (see figure).

Two points $(x_1,y_1)\ne(x_2,y_2)$ can not be connected by a cycle if and only if $x_1 = x_2$ or $y_1 = y_2$.

We define: Two points $P_1$, $P_2$ are (+)-parallel ($P_1 \parallel_+ P_2$) if $x_1 = x_2$ and (−)-parallel ($P_1\parallel_- P_2$) if $y_1 = y_2$.
Both these relations are equivalence relations on the set of points.

Two points $P_1,P_2$ are called parallel ($P_1\parallel P_2$) if $P_1 \parallel_+ P_2$ or $P_1 \parallel_- P_2$.

From the definition above we find:

Lemma:

- For any pair of non parallel points $A$, $B$ there is exactly one point $C$ with $A\parallel_+ C \parallel_- B$.
- For any point $P$ and any cycle $z$ there are exactly two points $A,B \in z$ with $A\parallel_+ P \parallel_- B$.
- For any three points $A$, $B$, $C$, pairwise non parallel, there is exactly one cycle $z$ that contains $A,B,C$.
- For any cycle $z$, any point $P \in z$ and any point $Q, P \not\parallel Q$ and $Q \notin z$ there exists exactly one cycle $z'$ such that $z \cap z' = \{P\}$, i.e. $z$ touches $z'$ at point $P$.

Like the classical Möbius and Laguerre planes Minkowski planes can be described as the geometry of plane sections of a suitable quadric. But in this case the quadric lives in projective 3-space: The classical real Minkowski plane is isomorphic to the geometry of plane sections of a hyperboloid of one sheet (not degenerated quadric of index 2).

== Axioms of a Minkowski plane ==
Let $\left( {\mathcal P} , {\mathcal Z} ; \parallel_+ , \parallel_- , \in \right)$ be an incidence structure with the set $\mathcal P$ of points, the set $\mathcal Z$ of cycles and two equivalence relations $\parallel_+$ ((+)-parallel) and $\parallel_-$ ((−)-parallel) on set $\mathcal P$. For $P\in \mathcal P$ we define: $\overline{P}_+ := \left\{ Q \in \mathcal P \mid Q\parallel_+ P \right\}$ and $\overline{P}_- := \left\{ Q \in \mathcal P \mid Q\parallel_- P \right\}$. An equivalence class $\overline{P}_+$ or $\overline{P}_-$ is called (+)-generator and (−)-generator, respectively. (For the space model of the classical Minkowski plane a generator is a line on the hyperboloid.)
Two points $A , B$ are called parallel ($A \parallel B$) if $A \parallel_+ B$ or $A \parallel_- B$.

An incidence structure $\mathfrak M := ( \mathcal P , \mathcal Z ; \parallel_+ , \parallel_- , \in )$ is called Minkowski plane if the following axioms hold:

Minkowski-axioms-c1-c2

Minkowski-axioms-c3-c4

- C1: For any pair of non parallel points $A,B$ there is exactly one point $C$ with $A\parallel_+ C \parallel_- B$.
- C2: For any point $P$ and any cycle $z$ there are exactly two points $A , B \in z$ with $A\parallel_+ P \parallel_- B$.
- C3: For any three points $A,B,C$, pairwise non parallel, there is exactly one cycle $z$ which contains $A , B , C$.
- C4: For any cycle $z$, any point $P\in z$ and any point $Q, P \not\parallel Q$ and $Q\notin z$ there exists exactly one cycle $z'$ such that $z \cap z' = \{ P \}$, i.e., $z$ touches $z'$ at point $P$.
- C5: Any cycle contains at least 3 points. There is at least one cycle $z$ and a point $P$ not in $z$.

For investigations the following statements on parallel classes (equivalent to C1, C2 respectively) are advantageous.

- C1′: For any two points $A$, $B$ we have $\left| \overline{A}_+ \cap\overline{B}_- \right| = 1$.
- C2′: For any point $P$ and any cycle $z$ we have: $\left| \overline{P}_+ \cap z \right| = 1 = \left| \overline{P}_- \cap z \right|$.

First consequences of the axioms are

Lemma—For a Minkowski plane ${\mathfrak M}$ the following is true

1. Any point is contained in at least one cycle.
2. Any generator contains at least 3 points.
3. Two points can be connected by a cycle if and only if they are non parallel.

Analogously to Möbius and Laguerre planes we get the connection to the linear geometry via the residues.

For a Minkowski plane $\mathfrak M = (\mathcal P, \mathcal Z; \parallel_+, \parallel_-, \in)$ and $P \in \mathcal P$ we define the local structure $\mathfrak A_P:= (\mathcal P \setminus \overline{P},\{z \setminus\{\overline{P}\} \mid P \in z \in \mathcal Z\} \cup \{E\setminus \overline{P} \mid E \in \mathcal E \setminus \{\overline{P}_+,\overline{P}_-\}\}, \in)$ and call it the residue at point P.

For the classical Minkowski plane $\mathfrak A_{(\infty,\infty)}$ is the real affine plane $\R^2$.

An immediate consequence of axioms C1 to C4 and C1′, C2′ are the following two theorems.

Theorem— For a Minkowski plane $\mathfrak M = ( \mathcal P , \mathcal Z ; \parallel_+ , \parallel , \in )$ any residue is an affine plane.

Theorem— Let be $\mathfrak M = (\mathcal P, \mathcal Z;\parallel_+,\parallel_-,\in)$ an incidence structure with two equivalence relations $\parallel_+$ and $\parallel_-$ on the set $\mathcal P$ of points (see above).

Then, $\mathfrak M$ is a Minkowski plane if and only if for any point $P$ the residue $\mathfrak A_P$ is an affine plane.

=== Minimal model ===
Minkowski plane: minimal model

The minimal model of a Minkowski plane can be established over the set $\overline{K}:=\{0,1,\infty\}$ of three elements: $\mathcal {P} := \overline{K}^2$
$$\begin{align}
\mathcal Z :\!&= \left\{ \{ (a_1,b_1),(a_2,b_2),(a_3,b_3) \} \mid \{a_1,a_2,a_3\} = \{b_1,b_2,b_3\} = \overline{K} \right\} \\
&= \{
\{ (0,0), (1,1), (\infty,\infty) \} , \; \{ (0,0), (1,\infty), (\infty,1) \}, \\
&\qquad\{ (0,1), (1,0), (\infty,\infty) \}, \; \{ (0,1), (1,\infty), (\infty,0) \}, \\
&\qquad\{ (0,\infty), (1,1), (\infty,0) \}, \; \{ (0,\infty), (1,0), (\infty,1) \} \}
\end{align}$$

Parallel points:

- $(x_1,y_1) \parallel_+ (x_2,y_2)$ if and only if $x_1 = x_2$
- $(x_1,y_1)\parallel_- (x_2,y_2)$ if and only if $y_1 = y_2$.

Hence $\left| \mathcal P \right| = 9$ and $\left| \mathcal Z \right| = 6$.

=== Finite Minkowski-planes ===
For finite Minkowski-planes we get from C1′, C2′:

Lemma—Let be $\mathfrak M =(\mathcal P, \mathcal Z; \parallel_+, \parallel_-,\in)$ a finite Minkowski plane, i.e. $\left| \mathcal P \right| < \infty$. For any pair of cycles $z_1 , z_2$ and any pair of generators $e_1 , e_2$ we have: $\left| z_1 \right| = \left| z_2 \right| = \left| e_1 \right| = \left| e_2 \right|$.

This gives rise of the definition:
For a finite Minkowski plane $\mathfrak M$ and a cycle $z$ of $\mathfrak M$ we call the integer $n = \left| z \right| - 1$ the order of ${\mathfrak M}$.

Simple combinatorial considerations yield

Lemma—For a finite Minkowski plane $\mathfrak M = (\mathcal P , \mathcal Z ; \parallel_+ , \parallel_- , \in )$ the following is true:

1. Any residue (affine plane) has order $n$.
2. $\left| \mathcal P \right| = ( n + 1 ) ^2$,
3. $\left| \mathcal Z \right| = ( n + 1) n ( n - 1 )$.

== Miquelian Minkowski planes ==
We get the most important examples of Minkowski planes by generalizing the classical real model: Just replace $\R$ by an arbitrary field $K$ then we get in any case a Minkowski plane ${\mathfrak M}(K)=({\mathcal P},{\mathcal Z};\parallel_+,\parallel_-,\in)$.

Analogously to Möbius and Laguerre planes the Theorem of Miquel is a characteristic property of a Minkowski plane $\mathfrak M (K)$.

Theorem of Miquel

Theorem (Miquel): For the Minkowski plane $\mathfrak M (K)$ the following is true:

If for any 8 pairwise not parallel points $P_1,...,P_8$ which can be assigned to the vertices of a cube such that the points in 5 faces correspond to concyclical quadruples, then the sixth quadruple of points is concyclical, too.

(For a better overview in the figure there are circles drawn instead of hyperbolas.)

Theorem (Chen): Only a Minkowski plane $\mathfrak M (K)$ satisfies the theorem of Miquel.

Because of the last theorem $\mathfrak M(K)$ is called a miquelian Minkowski plane.

Remark: The minimal model of a Minkowski plane is miquelian.

It is isomorphic to the Minkowski plane $\mathfrak M(K)$ with $K = \operatorname{GF}(2)$ (field $\{0,1\}$).

An astonishing result is

Theorem (Heise): Any Minkowski plane of even order is miquelian.

Remark: A suitable stereographic projection shows: $\mathfrak M(K)$ is isomorphic to the geometry of the plane sections on a hyperboloid of one sheet (quadric of index 2) in projective 3-space over field $K$.

Remark: There are a lot of Minkowski planes that are not miquelian (s. weblink below). But there are no "ovoidal Minkowski" planes, in difference to Möbius and Laguerre planes. Because any quadratic set of index 2 in projective 3-space is a quadric (see quadratic set).

== See also ==
- Conformal geometry
