= Benz plane =

Geometrical structure

In mathematics, a Benz plane is a type of 2-dimensional geometrical structure, named after the German mathematician Walter Benz. The term was applied to a group of objects that arise from a common axiomatization of certain structures and split into three families, which were introduced separately: Möbius planes, Laguerre planes, and Minkowski planes.

== Möbius plane ==
Classical Möbius plane: 2d/3d model

Starting from the real Euclidean plane and merging the set of lines with the set of circles to form a set of blocks results in an inhomogeneous incidence structure: three distinct points determine one block, but lines are distinguishable as a set of blocks that pairwise mutually intersect at one point without being tangent (or no points when parallel). Adding to the point set the new point $\infty$, defined to lie on every line results in every block being determined by exactly three points, as well as the intersection of any two blocks following a uniform pattern (intersecting at two points, tangent or non-intersecting). This homogeneous geometry is called classical inversive geometry or a Möbius plane. The inhomogeneity of the description (lines, circles, new point) can be seen to be non-substantive by using a 3-dimensional model. Using a stereographic projection, the classical Möbius plane may be seen to be isomorphic to the geometry of plane sections (circles) on a sphere in Euclidean 3-space.

Analogously to the (axiomatic) projective plane, an (axiomatic) Möbius plane defines an incidence structure. Möbius planes may similarly be constructed over fields other than the real numbers.

== Laguerre plane ==
classical Laguerre plane: 2d/3d-model

Starting again from $\textstyle \R^2$ and taking the curves with equations $y=ax^2+bx+c$ (parabolas and lines) as blocks, the following homogenization is effective: Add to the curve $y=ax^2+bx+c$ the new point $(\infty,a)$. Hence the set of points is $(\R\cup{\infty})\times\R$. This geometry of parabolas is called the classical Laguerre plane (Originally it was designed as the geometry of the oriented lines and circles. Both geometries are isomorphic.)

As for the Möbius plane, there exists a 3-dimensional model: the geometry of the elliptic plane sections on an orthogonal cylinder (in $\R^3$). An abstraction leads (analogously to the Möbius plane) to the axiomatic Laguerre plane.

== Minkowski plane ==
classical Minkowski plane: 2d/3d-model

Starting from $\R^2$ and merging the lines $y=mx+d, m\ne0$ with the hyperbolas $y=\tfrac{a}{x-b}+c, a\ne0$ in order to get the set of blocks, the following idea homogenizes the incidence structure: Add to any line the point $(\infty,\infty)$ and to any hyperbola $y=\tfrac{a}{x-b}+c, a\ne0$ the two points $(b,\infty), (\infty,c)$. Hence the point set is $(\R\cup\{\infty\})^2$. This geometry of the hyperbolas is called the classical Minkowski plane.

Analogously to the classical Möbius and Laguerre planes, there exists a 3-dimensional model: The classical Minkowski plane is isomorphic to the geometry of plane sections of a hyperboloid of one sheet (non-degenerate quadric of index 2) in 3-dimensional projective space. Similar to the first two cases we get the (axiomatic) Minkowski plane.

== Planar circle geometries or Benz planes ==
Because of the essential role of the circle (considered as the non-degenerate conic in a projective plane) and the plane description of the original models the three types of geometries are subsumed to planar circle geometries or in honor of Walter Benz, who considered these geometric structures from a common point of view, Benz planes.

== See also ==
- Conformal geometry
- Quadric
- Projective plane
- Laguerre transformations
