= Walter Benz =

German mathematician (1931–2017)

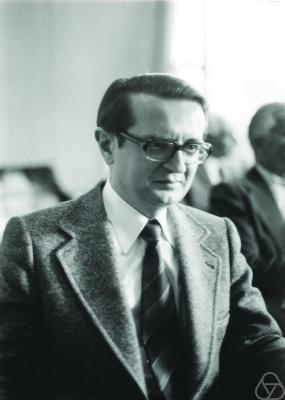
Walter Benz in 1975 (photo from the Oberwolfach Research Institute for Mathematics)

Walter Benz (May 2, 1931 Lahnstein – January 13, 2017 Ratzeburg) was a German mathematician, an expert in geometry.

Benz studied at the Johannes Gutenberg University of Mainz and received his doctoral degree in 1954, with Robert Furch as his advisor. After a position at the Johann Wolfgang Goethe University Frankfurt am Main, he served as a professor at Ruhr University Bochum, University of Waterloo, and University of Hamburg. Benz was honoured with the degree of a Dr. h.c.

Based on his book Vorlesungen über Geometrie der Algebren (Springer 1973), certain geometric objects are called Benz planes.

Inner product spaces over the real numbers provide the basis of a 2007 book by Benz: Classical Geometries in Modern Contexts.

== See also ==
- List of University of Waterloo people
