= Ovoid (polar space) =

In mathematics, an ovoid O of a (finite) polar space of rank r is a set of points, such that every subspace of rank $r-1$ intersects O in exactly one point.

== Cases ==
=== Symplectic polar space ===
An ovoid of $W_{2 n-1}(q)$ (a symplectic polar space of rank n) would contain $q^n+1$ points. However it only has an ovoid if and only $n=2$ and q is even. In that case, when the polar space is embedded into $PG(3,q)$ the classical way, it is also an ovoid in the projective geometry sense.

=== Hermitian polar space ===
Ovoids of $H(2n,q^2)(n\geq 2)$ and $H(2n+1,q^2)(n\geq 1)$ would contain $q^{2n+1}+1$ points.

=== Hyperbolic quadrics ===
An ovoid of a hyperbolic quadric$Q^{+}(2n-1,q)(n\geq 2)$would contain $q^{n-1}+1$ points.

=== Parabolic quadrics ===
An ovoid of a parabolic quadric $Q(2 n,q)(n\geq 2)$ would contain $q^n+1$ points. For $n=2$, it is easy to see to obtain an ovoid by cutting the parabolic quadric with a hyperplane, such that the intersection is an elliptic quadric. The intersection is an ovoid. If q is even, $Q(2n,q)$ is isomorphic (as polar space) with $W_{2 n-1}(q)$, and thus due to the above, it has no ovoid for $n\geq 3$.

=== Elliptic quadrics ===
An ovoid of an elliptic quadric $Q^{-}(2n+1,q)(n\geq 2)$would contain $q^{n}+1$ points.

== See also ==
- Ovoid (projective geometry)
