= Jeff Kahn (mathematician) =

American mathematician

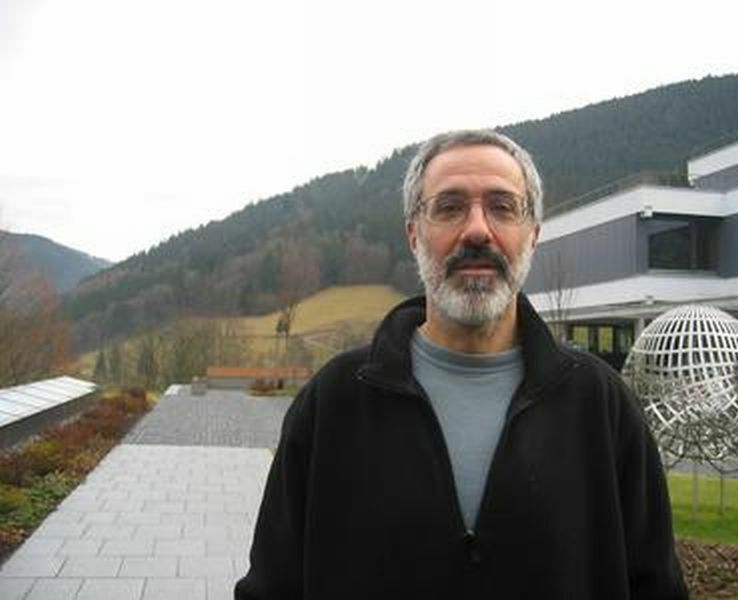
Jeff Kahn at Oberwolfach in 2008

Jeffry Ned Kahn is a professor of mathematics at Rutgers University who works primarily in combinatorics.

== Education ==
Kahn received his Ph.D. from Ohio State University in 1979 after completing his dissertation under his advisor Dijen K. Ray-Chaudhuri.

== Research ==
In 1980, he showed the importance of the bundle theorem for ovoidal Möbius planes. In 1993, together with Gil Kalai, he disproved Borsuk's conjecture. In 1996, he was awarded the Pólya Prize (SIAM).

== Awards and honors ==
He was an invited speaker at the 1994 International Congress of Mathematicians in Zurich.

In 2012, he was awarded the Fulkerson Prize (jointly with Anders Johansson and Van H. Vu) for determining the threshold of edge density above which a random graph can be covered by disjoint copies of a given smaller graph. Also in 2012, he became a fellow of the American Mathematical Society.
