= Möbius plane =

In mathematics, the classical Möbius plane (named after August Ferdinand Möbius) is the Euclidean plane supplemented by a single point at infinity. It is also called the inversive plane because it is closed under inversion with respect to any generalized circle, and thus a natural setting for planar inversive geometry.

An inversion of the Möbius plane with respect to any circle is an involution which fixes the points on the circle and exchanges the points in the interior and exterior, the center of the circle exchanged with the point at infinity. In inversive geometry a straight line is considered to be a generalized circle containing the point at infinity; inversion of the plane with respect to a line is a Euclidean reflection.

More generally, a Möbius plane is an incidence structure with the same incidence relationships as the classical Möbius plane. It is one of the Benz planes: Möbius plane, Laguerre plane and Minkowski plane.

== Relation to affine planes ==
Möbius-plane: touching relation

Affine planes are systems of points and lines that satisfy, amongst others, the property that two points determine exactly one line. This concept can be generalized to systems of points and circles, with each circle being determined by three non-collinear points. However, three collinear points determine a line, not a circle. This drawback can be removed by adding a point at infinity to every line. If we call both circles and such completed lines cycles, we get an incidence structure in which every three points determine exactly one cycle.

In an affine plane the parallel relation between lines is essential. In the geometry of cycles, this relation is generalized to the touching relation. Two cycles touch each other if they have just one point in common. This is true for two tangent circles or a line that is tangent to a circle. Two completed lines touch if they have only the point at infinity in common, so they are parallel. The touching relation has the property

- for any cycle $z$, point $P$ on $z$ and any point $Q$ not on $z$ there is exactly one cycle $z'$ containing points $P,Q$ and touching $z$ (at point $P$).

These properties essentially define an axiomatic Möbius plane. But the classical Möbius plane is not the only geometrical structure that satisfies the properties of an axiomatic Möbius plane. A simple further example of a Möbius plane can be achieved if one replaces the real numbers by rational numbers. The usage of complex numbers (instead of the real numbers) does not lead to a Möbius plane, because in the complex affine plane the curve $x^2+y^2=1$ is not a circle-like curve, but a hyperbola-like one. Fortunately there are a lot of fields (numbers) together with suitable quadratic forms that lead to Möbius planes (see below). Such examples are called miquelian, because they fulfill Miquel's six circles theorem. All these miquelian Möbius planes can be described by space models. The classical real Möbius plane can be considered as the geometry of circles on the unit sphere. The essential advantage of the space model is that any cycle is just a circle (on the sphere).

== Classical real Möbius plane ==
classical Moebius plane:2d/3d-model

We start from the real affine plane $\mathfrak {A}(\R)$ with the quadratic form $\rho(x,y)=x^2+y^2$ and get the real Euclidean plane: $\R^2$ is the point set, the lines are described by equations $y=mx+b$ or $x=c$ and a circle is a set of points that fulfills an equation

$$\rho(x-x_0,y-y_0)=(x-x_0)^2+(y-y_0)^2=r^2$$

for some $r > 0$. The geometry of lines and circles of the Euclidean plane can be homogenized (similarly to the projective completion of an affine plane) by embedding it into the incidence structure

$$({\mathcal P},{\mathcal Z},\in)$$

with

${\mathcal P}:=\R^2\cup \{\infty\}, \infty \notin \R$, the set of points, and
$\mathcal {Z}:=\{g\cup\{\infty\} \mid g \text{ line of } {\mathfrak A}(\R)\} \cup \{ k \mid k \text{ circle of } {\mathfrak A}(\R)\}$ the set of cycles.

Then $({\mathcal P},{\mathcal Z},\in)$ is called the classical real Möbius plane.

Within the new structure the completed lines play no special role anymore. Obviously $({\mathcal P},{\mathcal Z},\in)$ has the following properties.

- For any set of three points $A,B,C$ there is exactly one cycle $z$ which contains $A,B,C$.
- For any cycle $z$, any point $P\in z$ and $Q\notin z$ there exists exactly one cycle $z'$ with: $P,Q \in z'$ and $z\cap z' =\{P\}$, i.e., $z$ and $z'$ touch each other at point $P$.

$({\mathcal P},{\mathcal Z},\in)$ can be described using the complex numbers. $z=x+iy$ represents point $(x,y)\in \R^2$ and $\overline{z}=x-iy$ is the complex conjugate of $z$:

${\mathcal P}:=\Complex\cup \{\infty\}, \infty \notin \Complex$, and
${\mathcal Z}:=\{\{z\in \Complex\mid az+\overline{az}+b=0\ \text{(line)} \ \} \cup \{\infty\} \mid \ 0\ne a \in\Complex, b\in \R\}$

$$\cup \{\{ z \in\Complex \mid (z-z_0)\overline{(z-z_0)}=d \ \text{(circle)} \mid z_0 \in \Complex, d\in \R, d>0\}.$$

The advantage of this description is, that one checks easily that the following permutations of ${\mathcal P}$ map cycles onto cycles.

1. $z \rightarrow rz,\ \ \infty \rightarrow \infty, \quad$ with $r\in \Complex$ (rotation + dilatation)
2. $z \rightarrow z+s, \ \ \infty \rightarrow \infty, \quad$ with $s\in \Complex$ (translation)
3. $z \rightarrow \displaystyle \frac{1}{z},\ z\ne 0,\ \ 0 \rightarrow \infty,\ \ \infty \rightarrow 0, \quad$ (reflection at $\pm 1$)
4. $z \rightarrow \overline{z},\ \ \infty\rightarrow \infty. \quad$ (reflection or inversion through the real axis)

Considering $\Complex\cup \{\infty\}$ as projective line over $\Complex$ one recognizes that the mappings (1)-(3) generate the group $\operatorname{PGL}(2,\Complex)$ (see PGL(2,C), Möbius transformation). The geometry $({\mathcal P},{\mathcal Z},\in)$ is a homogeneous structure, i.e., its automorphism group is transitive. Hence from (4) we get: For any cycle there exists an inversion. For example: $z \rightarrow \tfrac{1}{\overline{z}}$ is the inversion which fixes the unit circle $z\overline{z}=1$. This property gives rise to the alternate name inversive plane.

stereographic projection

Similarly to the space model of a desarguesian projective plane there exists a space model for the geometry $({\mathcal P},{\mathcal Z},\in)$ which omits the formal difference between cycles defined by lines and cycles defined by circles: The geometry $({\mathcal P},{\mathcal Z},\in)$ is isomorphic to the geometry of circles on a sphere. The isomorphism can be performed by a suitable stereographic projection. For example:

$$\Phi: \ (x,y) \rightarrow \left(\frac{x}{1+x^2+y^2},\frac{y}{1+x^2+y^2},\frac{x^2+y^2}{1+x^2+y^2} \right) = (u,v,w)\ .$$

$\Phi$ is a projection with center $(0,0,1)$ and maps

- the $xy$-plane onto the sphere with equation $u^2+v^2+w^2-w=0$, midpoint $(0,0,\tfrac{1}{2})$ and radius $r=\tfrac{1}{2};$
- the circle with equation $x^2+y^2-ax-by-c=0$ into the plane $au+bv-(1+c)w+c=0$. That means the image of a circle is a plane section of the sphere and hence a circle (on the sphere) again. The corresponding planes do not contain the center, $(0,0,1)$;
- the line $ax+by+c=0$ into the plane $au+bv-cw+c=0$. So, the image of a line is a circle (on the sphere) through the point $(0,0,1)$ but omitting the point $(0,0,1)$.

== Axioms of a Möbius plane ==
The incidence behavior of the classical real Möbius plane gives rise to the following definition of an axiomatic Möbius plane.

Möbius plane: axioms (A1),(A2)

An incidence structure $\mathfrak M=({\mathcal P},{\mathcal Z},\in)$ with point set ${\mathcal P}$ and set of cycles ${\mathcal Z}$ is called a Möbius plane if the following axioms hold:

A1: For any three points $A,B,C$ there is exactly one cycle $z$ that contains $A,B,C$.
A2: For any cycle $z$, any point $P\in z$ and $Q\notin z$ there exists exactly one cycle $z'$ with: $P,Q \in z'$ and $z\cap z' =\{P\}$ ($z$ and $z'$ touch each other at point $P$).
A3: Any cycle contains at least three points. There is at least one cycle.

Four points $A,B,C,D$ are concyclic if there is a cycle $z$ with $A,B,C,D \in z$.

One should not expect that the axioms above define the classical real Möbius plane. There are many axiomatic Möbius planes which are different from the classical one (see below). Similar to the minimal model of an affine plane is the "minimal model" of a Möbius plane. It consists of $5$ points:

Möbius plane: minimal model (only the cycles containing $\infty$ are drawn. Any set of 3 points is a cycle.)

${\mathcal P}:=\{A,B,C,D,\infty\}, \quad {\mathcal Z}:= \{ z \mid z\subset{\mathcal P}, |z|=3\}.$ Hence: $|\mathcal{Z}|={5\choose 3}=10.$

The connection between the classical Möbius plane and the real affine plane is similar to that between the minimal model of a Möbius plane and the minimal model of an affine plane. This strong connection is typical for Möbius planes and affine planes (see below).

For a Möbius plane $\mathfrak M=({\mathcal P},{\mathcal Z},\in)$ and $P \in {\mathcal P}$ we define structure ${\mathfrak A}_P:= ({\mathcal P}\setminus\{P\},\{z\setminus\{P\}\mid P\in z\in{\mathcal Z}\}, \in)$ and call it the residue at point P.

For the classical model the residue ${\mathfrak A}_\infty$ at point $\infty$ is the underlying real affine plane. The essential meaning of the residue shows the following theorem.

Theorem: Any residue of a Möbius plane is an affine plane.

This theorem allows to use the many results on affine planes for investigations on Möbius planes and gives rise to an equivalent definition of a Möbius plane:

Theorem: An incidence structure $({\mathcal P},{\mathcal Z},\in)$ is a Möbius plane if and only if the following property is fulfilled:

A': For any point $P \in {\mathcal P}$ the residue ${\mathfrak A}_P$ is an affine plane.

For finite Möbius planes, i.e., $|{\mathcal P}|<\infty$, we have (as with affine planes):

Any two cycles of a Möbius plane have the same number of points.

This justifies the following definition:

For a finite Möbius plane $\mathfrak M=({\mathcal P},{\mathcal Z},\in)$ and a cycle $z\in {\mathcal Z}$ the integer $n:=|z|-1$ is called the order of $\mathfrak M$.

From combinatorics we get:

Let $\mathfrak M=({\mathcal P},{\mathcal Z},\in)$ be a Möbius plane of order $n$. Then (a) any residue ${\mathfrak A}_P$ is an affine plane of order $n$, (b) $\vert{\mathcal P}\vert=n^2+1$, (c) $\vert{\mathcal Z}\vert=n(n^2+1)$.

== Miquelian Möbius planes ==
Looking for further examples of Möbius planes it seems promising to generalize the classical construction starting with a quadratic form $\rho$ on an affine plane over a field $K$ for defining circles. But, just to replace the real numbers $\R$ by any field $K$ and to keep the classical quadratic form $x^2+y^2$ for describing the circles does not work in general. For details one should look into the lecture note below. So, only for suitable pairs of fields and quadratic forms one gets Möbius planes $\mathfrak M (K,\rho)$. They are (as the classical model) characterized by huge homogeneity and the following theorem of Miquel.

Theorem of Miquel

Theorem (Miquel): For the Möbius plane $\mathfrak M (K,\rho)$ the following is true:

If for any 8 points $P_1,...,P_8$ which can be assigned to the vertices of a cube such that the points in 5 faces correspond to concyclical quadruples, then the sixth quadruple of points is concyclical, too.

The converse is true, too.

Theorem (Chen): Only a Möbius plane $\mathfrak M (K,\rho)$ satisfies the Theorem of Miquel.

Because of the last Theorem a Möbius plane $\mathfrak M(K,\rho)$ is called a miquelian Möbius plane.

Remark: The minimal model of a Möbius plane is miquelian. It is isomorphic to the Möbius plane

$\mathfrak M(K,\rho)$ with $K = \mathrm{GF}(2)$ (field $\{0,1\}$) and ${{{1}}}$.
(For example, the unit circle $x^2+xy+y^2=1$ is the point set $\{(0,1),(1,0),(1,1)\}$.)

Remark: If we choose $K=\Complex$ the field of complex numbers, there is no suitable quadratic form at all.

The choice $K=\mathbb{Q}$ (the field of rational numbers) and $\rho(x,y)=x^2+y^2$ is suitable.
The choice $K=\mathbb{Q}$ (the field of rational numbers) and $\rho(x,y)=x^2-2y^2$ is suitable, too.

Remark: A stereographic projection shows: $\mathfrak M(K,\rho)$ is isomorphic to the geometry of the plane

sections on a sphere (nondegenerate quadric of index 1) in projective 3-space over field $K$.

Remark: A proof of Miquel's theorem for the classical (real) case can be found at the article Miquel's six circles theorem. It is elementary and based on the theorem of an inscribed angle.

Remark: There are many Möbius planes which are not miquelian (see weblink below). The class which is most similar to miquelian Möbius planes are the ovoidal Möbius planes. An ovoidal Möbius plane is the geometry of the plane sections of an ovoid. An ovoid is a quadratic set and bears the same geometric properties as a sphere in a projective 3-space: 1) a line intersects an ovoid in none, one or two points and 2) at any point of the ovoid the set of the tangent lines form a plane, the tangent plane. A simple ovoid in real 3-space can be constructed by glueing together two suitable halves of different ellipsoids, such that the result is not a quadric. Even in the finite case there exist ovoids (see quadratic set). Ovoidal Möbius planes are characterized by the bundle theorem.

== Finite Möbius planes and block designs ==
A block design with the parameters of the one-point extension of a finite affine plane of order $n$, i.e., a $3$-$(n^2 + 1, n + 1, 1)$-design, is a Möbius plane of order $n$.

These finite block designs satisfy the axioms defining a Möbius plane, when a circle is interpreted as a block of the design.

The only known finite values for the order of a Möbius plane are prime or prime powers. The only known finite Möbius planes are constructed within finite projective geometries.

== See also ==
- Conformal geometry
- Möbius transformation
