= Quadratic set =

In mathematics, a quadratic set is a set of points in a projective space that bears the same essential incidence properties as a quadric (conic section in a projective plane, sphere or cone or hyperboloid in a projective space).

== Definition of a quadratic set ==
Let $\mathfrak P=({\mathcal P},{\mathcal G},\in)$ be a projective space. A quadratic set is a non-empty subset ${\mathcal Q}$ of ${\mathcal P}$ for which the following two conditions hold:

(QS1) Every line $g$ of ${\mathcal G}$ intersects ${\mathcal Q}$ in at most two points or is contained in ${\mathcal Q}$.

($g$ is called exterior to ${\mathcal Q}$ if $|g\cap {\mathcal Q}|=0$, tangent to ${\mathcal Q}$ if either $|g\cap {\mathcal Q}|=1$ or $g\cap {\mathcal Q}=g$, and secant to ${\mathcal Q}$ if $|g\cap {\mathcal Q}|=2$.)

(QS2) For any point $P\in {\mathcal Q}$ the union ${\mathcal Q}_P$ of all tangent lines through $P$ is a hyperplane or the entire space ${\mathcal P}$.

A quadratic set ${\mathcal Q}$ is called non-degenerate if for every point $P\in {\mathcal Q}$, the set ${\mathcal Q}_P$ is a hyperplane.

A Pappian projective space is a projective space in which Pappus's hexagon theorem holds.

The following result, due to Francis Buekenhout, is an astonishing statement for finite projective spaces.

Theorem: Let be $\mathfrak P_n$ a finite projective space of dimension $n\ge 3$ and ${\mathcal Q}$ a non-degenerate quadratic set that contains lines. Then: $\mathfrak P_n$ is Pappian and ${\mathcal Q}$ is a quadric with index $\ge 2$.

== Definition of an oval and an ovoid ==
Ovals and ovoids are special quadratic sets:
Let $\mathfrak P$ be a projective space of dimension $\ge 2$. A non-degenerate quadratic set $\mathcal O$ that does not contain lines is called ovoid (or oval in plane case).

The following equivalent definitions of an oval/ovoid are more common:

Definition: (oval) A non-empty point set $\mathfrak o$ of a projective plane is called oval if the following properties are fulfilled:

(o1) Any line meets $\mathfrak o$ in at most two points.
(o2) For any point $P$ in $\mathfrak o$ there is one and only one line $g$ such that $g\cap \mathfrak o=\{P\}$.

A line $g$ is a exterior or tangent or secant line of the oval if $|g\cap \mathfrak o|=0$ or $|g\cap \mathfrak o|=1$ or $|g\cap \mathfrak o|=2$ respectively.

For finite planes the following theorem provides a more simple definition.

Theorem: (oval in finite plane) Let be $\mathfrak P$ a projective plane of order $n$. A set $\mathfrak o$ of points is an oval if $|\mathfrak o|=n+1$ and if no three points of $\mathfrak o$ are collinear.

According to this theorem of Beniamino Segre, for Pappian projective planes of odd order the ovals are just conics:

Theorem: Let be $\mathfrak P$ a Pappian projective plane of odd order. Any oval in $\mathfrak P$ is an oval conic (non-degenerate quadric).

Definition: (ovoid) A non-empty point set $\mathcal O$ of a projective space is called ovoid if the following properties are fulfilled:

(O1) Any line meets $\mathcal O$ in at most two points.
($g$ is called exterior, tangent and secant line if $|g\cap {\mathcal O}|=0, \ |g\cap {\mathcal O}|=1$ and $|g\cap {\mathcal O}|=2$ respectively.)
(O2) For any point $P\in {\mathcal O}$ the union ${\mathcal O}_P$ of all tangent lines through $P$ is a hyperplane (tangent plane at $P$).

Example:

a) Any sphere (quadric of index 1) is an ovoid.
b) In case of real projective spaces one can construct ovoids by combining halves of suitable ellipsoids such that they are no quadrics.

For finite projective spaces of dimension $n$ over a field $K$ we have:
Theorem:

a) In case of $|K| <\infty$ an ovoid in $\mathfrak P_n(K)$ exists only if $n=2$ or $n=3$.
b) In case of $|K| <\infty,\ \operatorname{char} K \ne 2$ an ovoid in $\mathfrak P_n(K)$ is a quadric.

Counterexamples (Tits–Suzuki ovoid) show that i.g. statement b) of the theorem above is not true for $\operatorname{char} K=2$:
