= List of Polish war cemeteries =

The following is an incomplete list of national war cemeteries of Polish soldiers around the world. Unless stated otherwise, the cemeteries include the graves of the World War II veterans.

== Austria ==
- Polish military quarter at the Vienna Central Cemetery

== Belarus ==
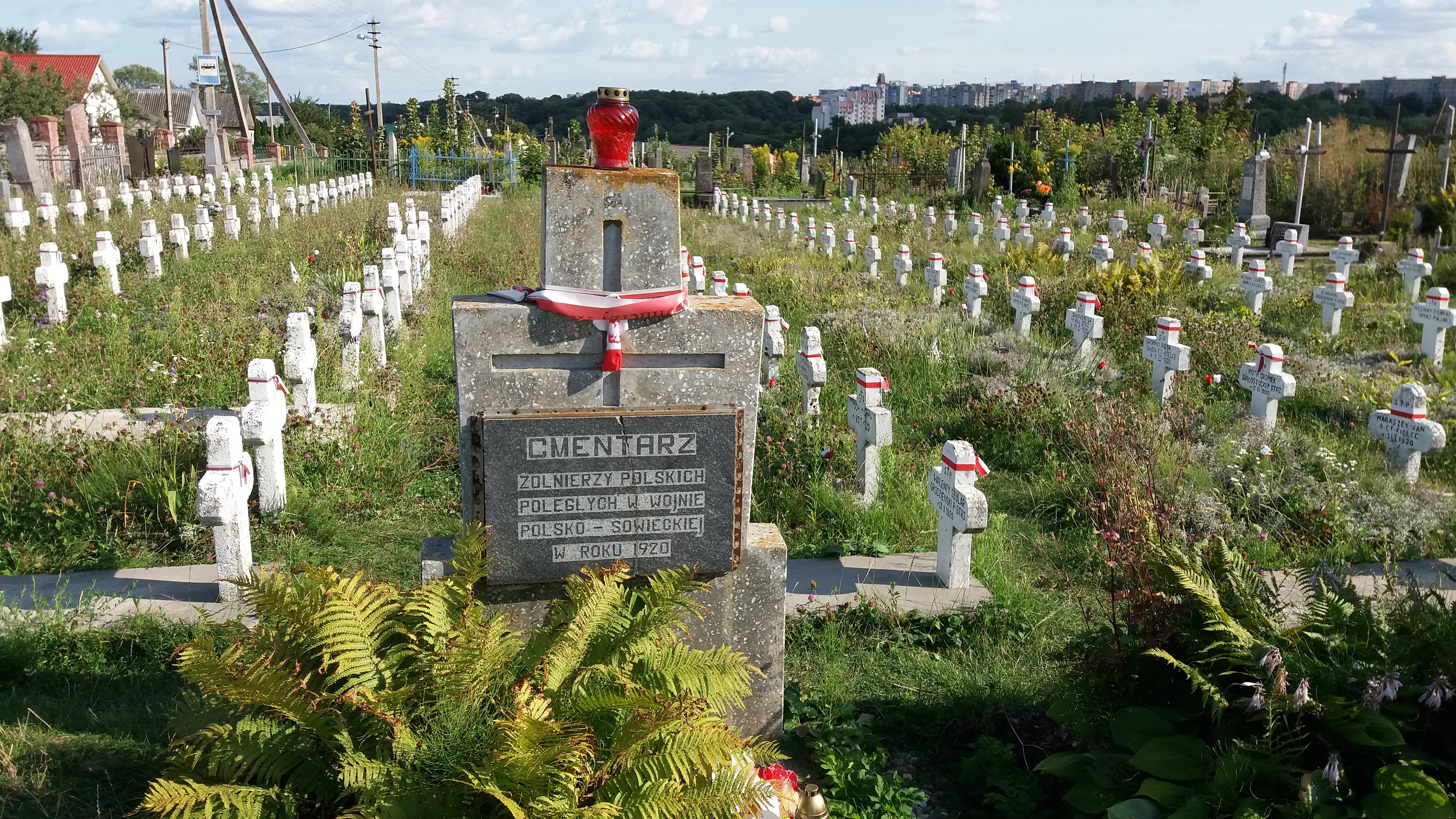
Polish military quarter at the Catholic Parish Cemetery in Grodno

- Polish military quarter in Ashmyany (Polish–Soviet War of 1919–1921)
- Polish military quarter in Braslaw (Polish–Soviet War of 1919–1921)
- Polish Garrison Cemetery in Brest
- Polish military quarter at the Catholic cemetery in Brest (Polish–Soviet War of 1919–1921)
- Polish war cemetery in Brest (Polish–Soviet War of 1919–1921)
- Polish war cemetery in Dawhinava (Polish–Soviet War of 1919–1921)
- Polish war cemetery in Dokshytsy (Polish–Soviet War of 1919–1921)
- Polish war cemetery in Draguny (Polish–Soviet War of 1919–1921)
- Polish war cemetery in Dunilavičy (Polish–Soviet War of 1919–1921)
- Polish military quarter at the Catholic Parish Cemetery in Grodno (Polish–Soviet War of 1919–1921)
- Polish military quarters at the Military Cemetery in Grodno (Polish–Soviet War of 1919–1921 and World War II)
- Polish military quarter at the Catholic cemetery in Halshany (Polish–Soviet War of 1919–1921)
- Polish military quarter in Hiermanavičy (Polish–Soviet War of 1919–1921)

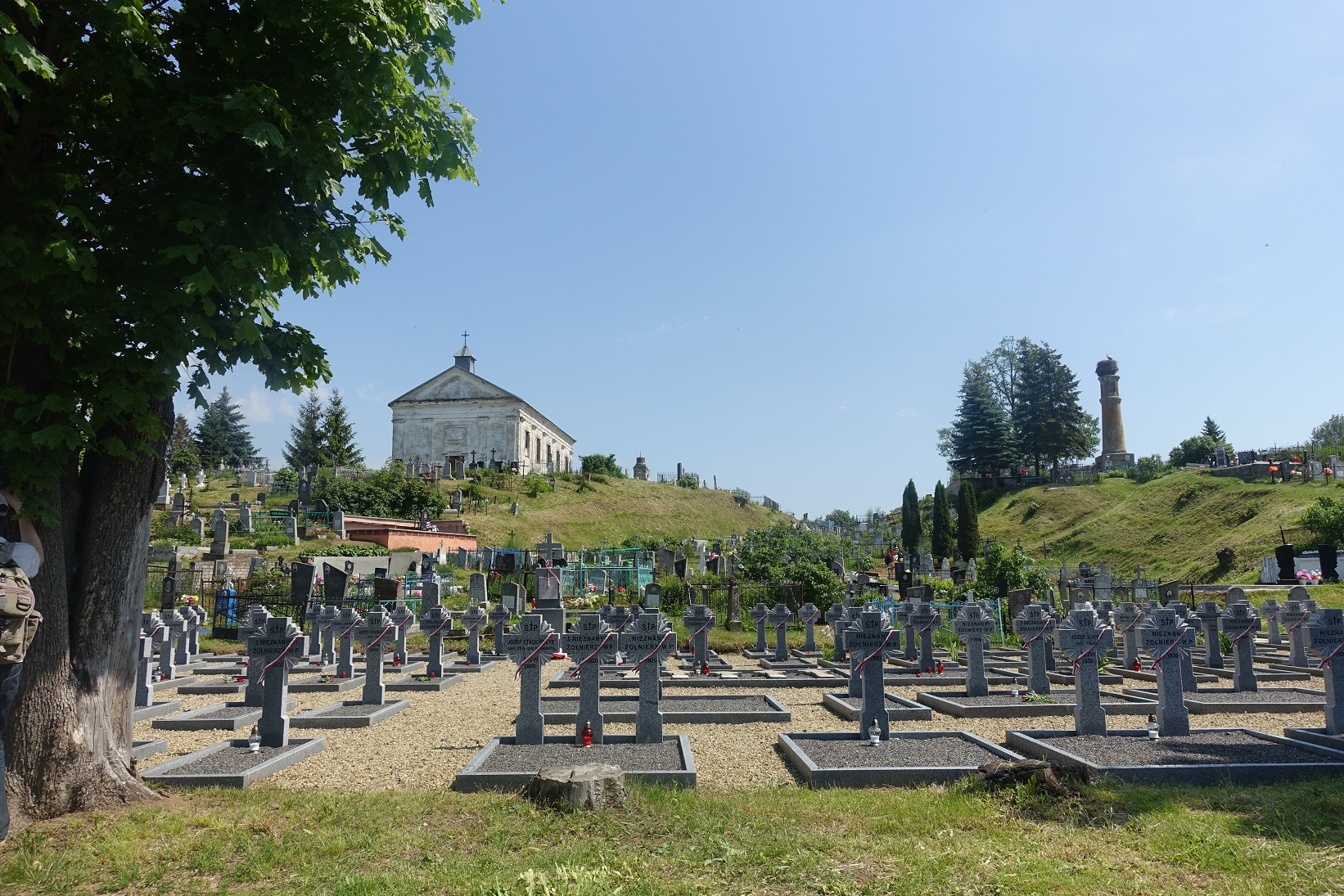
Polish military quarter in Hlybokaye

- Polish military quarter in Hlybokaye (Polish–Soviet War of 1919–1921)
- Polish military quarter in Jazna (Polish–Soviet War of 1919–1921)
- Polish military quarter in Kobryn (Polish–Soviet War of 1919–1921 and World War II)
- Polish war cemetery in Kruliaŭščyna (Polish–Soviet War of 1919–1921)
- Polish military quarter at the Catholic cemetery in Kryvichy (Polish–Soviet War of 1919–1921)
- Polish war cemetery in Kuraniec (Polish–Soviet War of 1919–1921)
- Polish military quarter in Lida (Polish–Soviet War of 1919–1921)
- Polish military quarter at the Catholic cemetery in Lužki (Polish–Soviet War of 1919–1921)
- Polish military quarter at the Catholic cemetery in Lyntupy (Polish–Soviet War of 1919–1921)
- Polish military quarter in Miory (Polish–Soviet War of 1919–1921)
- Polish military quarter in Myadzyel (Polish–Soviet War of 1919–1921)
- Polish war cemetery in Novy Svieržań (Polish–Soviet War of 1919–1921)
- Polish military quarter in Nyasvizh (Polish–Soviet War of 1919–1921)
- Polish military quarter in Padsvillye (Polish–Soviet War of 1919–1921)
- Polish military quarter at the Catholic cemetery in Pruzhany (Polish–Soviet War of 1919–1921)
- Polish military quarter in Radashkovichy (Polish–Soviet War of 1919–1921)
- Polish military quarter at the Catholic cemetery in Shchuchyn (Polish–Soviet War of 1919–1921)
- Polish war cemetery in Slabodka (Polish–Soviet War of 1919–1921)
- Polish military quarter at the Catholic cemetery in Slonim (Polish–Soviet War of 1919–1921)
- Polish military quarter in Užanka (Polish–Soviet War of 1919–1921)
- Polish military quarter in Valkalata (Polish–Soviet War of 1919–1921)
- Polish military quarter in Varniany (Polish–Soviet War of 1919–1921)
- Polish war cemetery in Vawkavysk (Polish–Soviet War of 1919–1921)
- Polish military quarter in Vileyka (Polish–Soviet War of 1919–1921)
- Polish military quarter in Vishnyeva (Polish–Soviet War of 1919–1921)
- Polish military quarter at the Catholic cemetery in Vysokaye (Polish–Soviet War of 1919–1921)
- Polish military quarter in Zadarožža (Polish–Soviet War of 1919–1921)

== Belgium ==
- Lommel (Haltstraat)
- Oostende

== Canada ==
- Polish Soldier's Burial Plot in Niagara-on-the-Lake (World War I)

== France ==
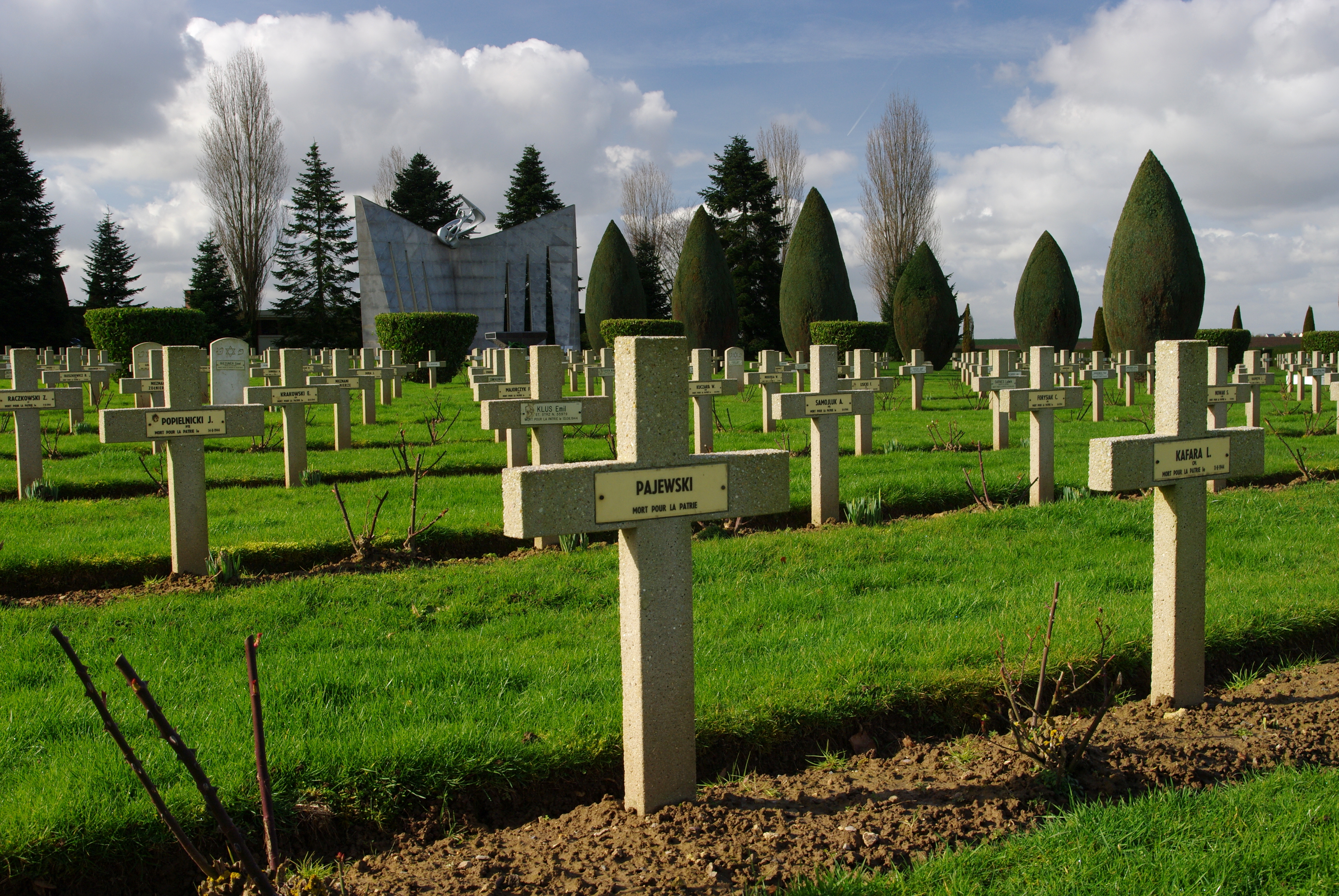
Grainville-Langannerie Polish war cemetery

- Cimetière militaire Polonais du Bois du Puits Polish war cemetery in Aubérive (World War I and II)
- Grainville-Langannerie Polish war cemetery

== Germany ==
- Altengrabow (Stalag XI-A, cemetery demolished by the Red Army)
- Bay of Lübeck (5 wreck cemeteries with 352 Polish victims of SS Cap Arcona)
- Bergen Belsen (1414 graves)
- Berlin (several dozen cemeteries)
- Braunschweig
- Bremen, Osterholz (several hundred graves)
- Buchenwald
- Dachau
- Darmstadt
- Dora
- Dössel (139 officers of Oflag VI B)
- Eisenhüttenstadt
- Esslingen am Neckar
- Flensburg
- Flossenbürg
- Frankfurt, Hauptfriedhof (more than 650 graves)
- Fulda
- Fürstenau (44 graves of soldiers of Polish 1st Independent Parachute Brigade)
- Giessen
- Görlitz
- Grafeneck
- Hadamar (victims of T4 programme)

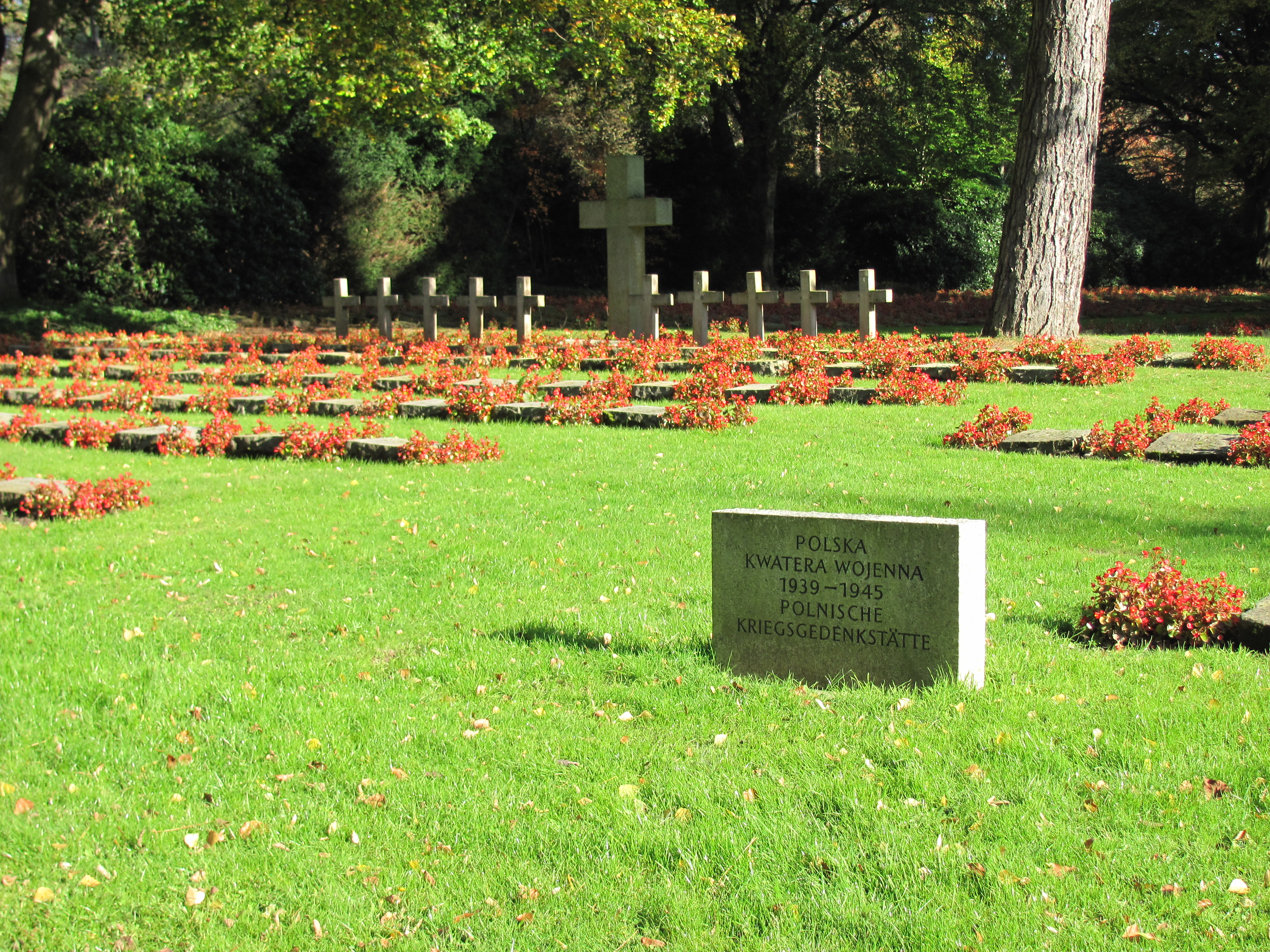
Polish military quarter at the Ohlsdorf Cemetery in Hamburg

- Hamburg, Main Cemetery Ohlsdorf
- Hannover (7 different cemeteries)
- Heide
- Heidelberg (47 graves)
- Heilbronn
- Herford
- Hinzert
- Itzehoe
- Jacobsthal (municipality of Zeithain, in Saxony) 44 Poles from the 1944 Warsaw Uprising, prisoners in Stalag IV-B/Z, Zeithain, buried in the Polish section of the Italian Cemetery. After the war, under Soviet domination, the area was a tank-driving training ground and artillery firing range, and the cemetery was obliterated. In 2004, the 44 Polish (and a dozen Serbian) graves were located, and the remains transferred to an existing cemetery in Neuburxdorf (Bad Liebenwerda, in Brandenburg) (see below in this list)
- Karlsruhe (96 graves)
- Kassel
- Kiel (Nordfriedhof 9 airmen, Eichhoffriedhof several dozen graves)
- Kochendorf
- Lich (45 graves)
- Lower Saxony (Niedersachsen) - several cemeteries not listed here.
- Ludwigsburg
- Ludwigshafen (172 graves)
- Lübeck, Vorwerk cemetery (220 graves)
- Lüneburg
- Mainz (officers of Oflag XII-B)
- Mannheim (ca. 200 graves)
- Moringen
- Murnau (49 graves of Oflag VII-A)
- Neuburxdorf (Bad Liebenwerda in Brandenburg) a number of Polish POWs from nearby Stalag IV-B Mühlberg; in 2004, 44 Polish graves were transferred here from Jacobsthal (see above in this list)
- Neue Bremm
- Neuengamme
- Neuhaus
- Neumarkt
- Neumünster
- Nordhausen
- Oranienburg
- Osthofen
- Ostfriesland (36 cemeteries of the Polish 1st Armoured Division)
- Perl
- Prenzlau
- Ravensbrück
- Reichswalde-Kleve (63 airmen and 8 paras)
- Reichswald Forest
- Reutlingen (29 graves)
- Riegelsberg
- Rodgal
- Rensburg
- Saarbrücken
- Sachsenhausen
- Sage near Oldenburg (20 graves)
- Salzgitter
- Salzwedel
- Sandbostel (POW camp)
- Schleswig
- Stukenbrock
- Stuttgart (131 graves)
- Tangerhütte (cemetery demolished, number of victims unknown)
- Tübingen
- Wetzlar
- Wiesbaden (33 cemeteries in and around the town)
- Wildflecken (Kreuzweg der Nationen - 116 adults and 428 children who died shortly after liberation)
- Wolfenbüttel
- Worms (7 graves)

== Hungary ==
- Polish military quarter in Budakeszi (15 soldiers)
- Polish military quarter in Rákoskeresztúr, Budapest (over 100 soldiers)
- Polish military quarter in Eger (11 soldiers)
- Polish military quarter in Győr (45 soldiers)
- Grave at the cemetery in Kadarkút (1 officer)
- Polish graves at the war cemetery in Solymár (37 military pilots)

== Iran ==
- Bandar Anzali (formerly Pahlevi, 639 graves)
- Esfahan (New Julfa, 18 graves)
- Tehran (Doulab, 1937 graves) (Beheshtieh Jewish Cemetery, 56 graves)
- Ahwaz (102 graves)
- Qazvin (40 graves) (as from 2008, no longer exists)
- Mashhad (29 graves)
- Khoramshahr (5 graves)

== Iraq ==
- Khanaqin/Alwand (437 Polish soldiers. All headstones destroyed)

== Israel ==
- Polish military quarter in Jaffa
- Polish military quarter in the Mount Zion Franciscan Cemetery in Jerusalem

== Italy ==
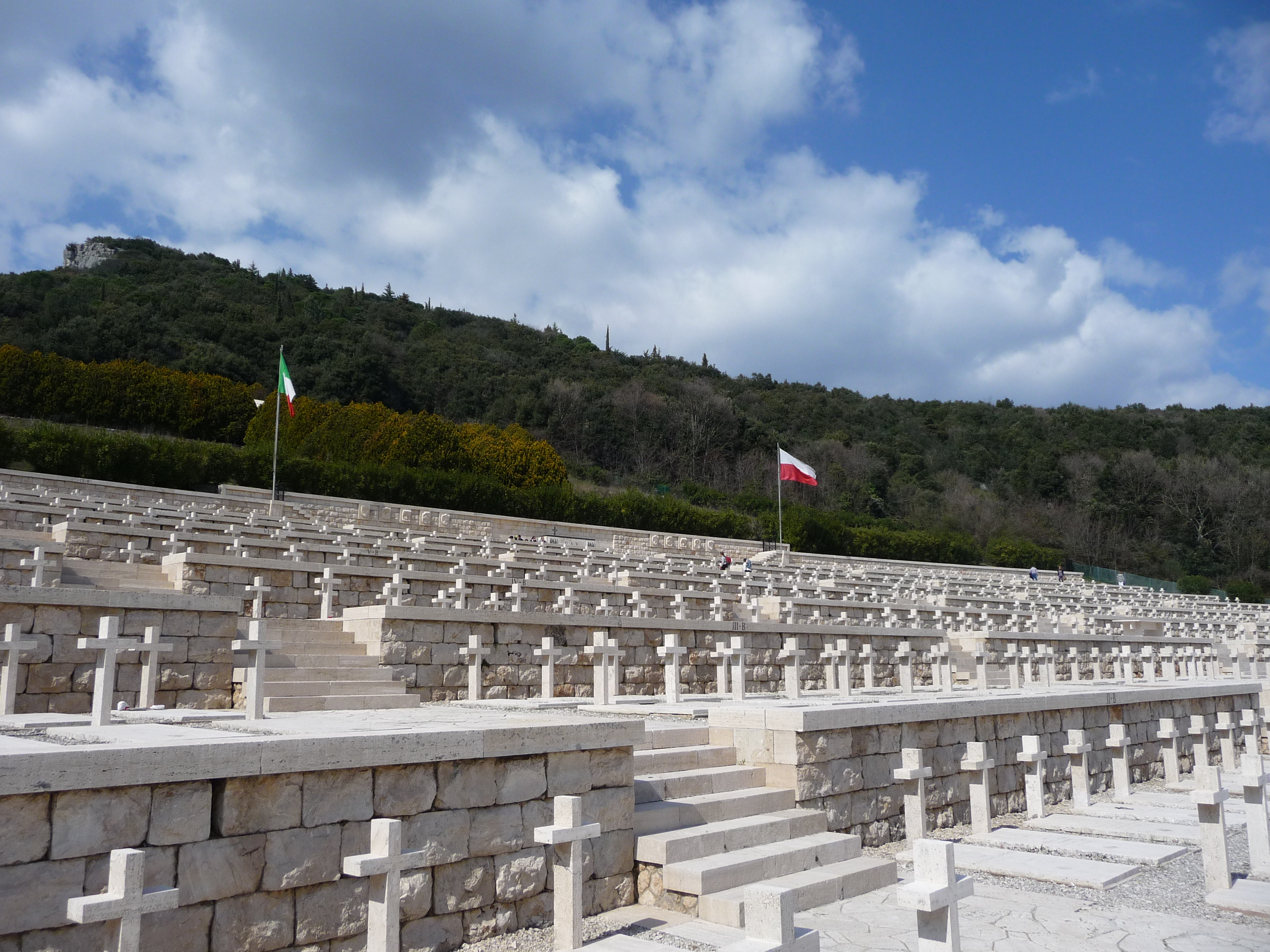
Monte Cassino Polish war cemetery

- San Lazzaro near Bologna (1432 soldiers)
- Polish Soldier Cemetery @ Casamassina (430 soldiers)
- Loreto (1081 soldiers)
- Polish Soldier Cemetery @ Monte Cassino (1072 soldiers)
- Polish military quarter in Santa Maria Capua Vetere (post-World War I)

== Kazakhstan ==
- Lugova
- Lugovaya
- Mankent
- Merke
- Shokpak
- Vysokoye

== Kyrgyzstan ==
- Jalal Abad

== Latvia ==
- Polish military quarter in Ezernieki (Polish–Soviet War of 1919–1921)
- Polish military quarter in Krāslava (Polish–Soviet War of 1919–1921)
- Polish military quarter in Laucesa (Polish–Soviet War of 1919–1921)
- Polish military quarter in Višķi (Polish–Soviet War of 1919–1921)

== Libya ==
- Tobruk (Graves destroyed by revolutionist.)

== Lithuania ==
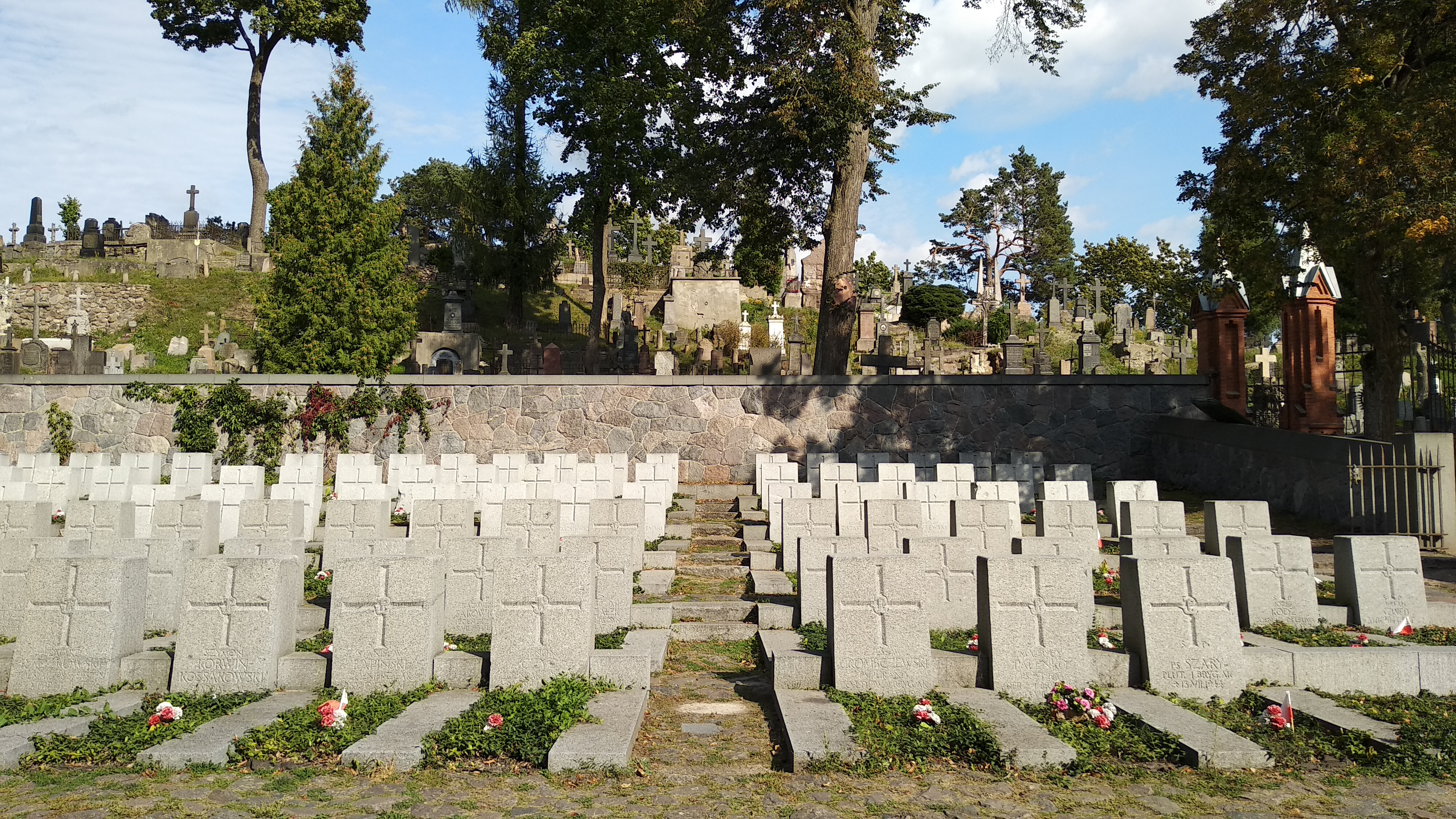
Polish military quarter in Rasos Cemetery, Vilnius

- Polish military quarter at the Antakalnis Cemetery (Polish–Soviet War of 1919–1921 and World War II; over 1,600 soldiers)
- Two Polish military quarters at the Rasos Cemetery (Polish–Soviet War of 1919–1921 and World War II)
- Polish military quarter in Dūkštas (Polish–Soviet War of 1919–1921; over 100 soldiers)
- Polish Home Army quarter in Dubičiai
- Polish Home Army quarter in Eišiškės
- Polish Home Army quarter in Kalesninkai (24 soldiers)
- Polish military quarter in Maišiagala (Polish–Soviet War of 1919–1921)
- Polish military quarter at the parish cemetery in Marcinkonys (Polish–Soviet War of 1919–1921)
- Polish military quarter in Nemenčinė (Polish–Soviet War of 1919–1921)
- Polish Home Army quarter in Pavilnys (around 120 soldiers)
- Polish military quarter in Pavoverė (Polish–Soviet War of 1919–1921)
- Polish and Lithuanian war cemetery in Širvintos (Polish–Lithuanian War)
- Polish Home Army quarter in Skurbutėnai
- Polish military quarter in Švenčionėliai (Polish–Soviet War of 1919–1921; around 500 soldiers)
- Polish military quarter in Trakai (Polish–Soviet War of 1919–1921; over 100 soldiers)
- Polish military quarter in Varėna (Polish–Soviet War of 1919–1921; 18 soldiers)
- Polish military quarter at the Military Cemetery in Vingis, Vilnius (Polish–Soviet War of 1919–1921)

== Netherlands ==
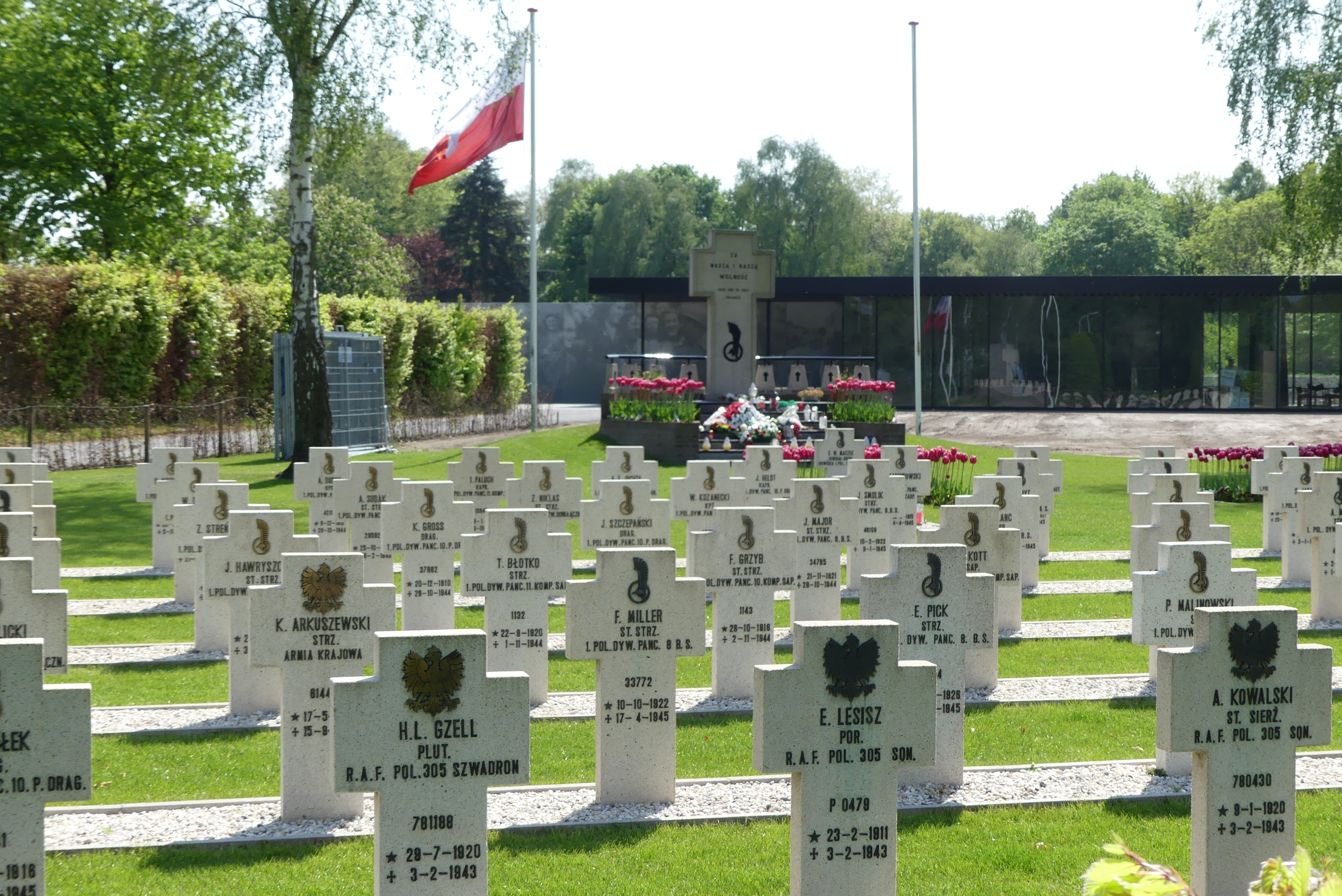
Polish Military Cemetery in Breda

- Arnhem Oosterbeek War Cemetery
- Breda (161 soldiers)
- Ginneken
- Goirle War Cemetery
- Erehof Lemmer
- Axel (22 soldiers)

== Norway ==
- Polish military quarter in Håkvik

== Romania ==
- Cârlibaba (World War I)

== Russia ==
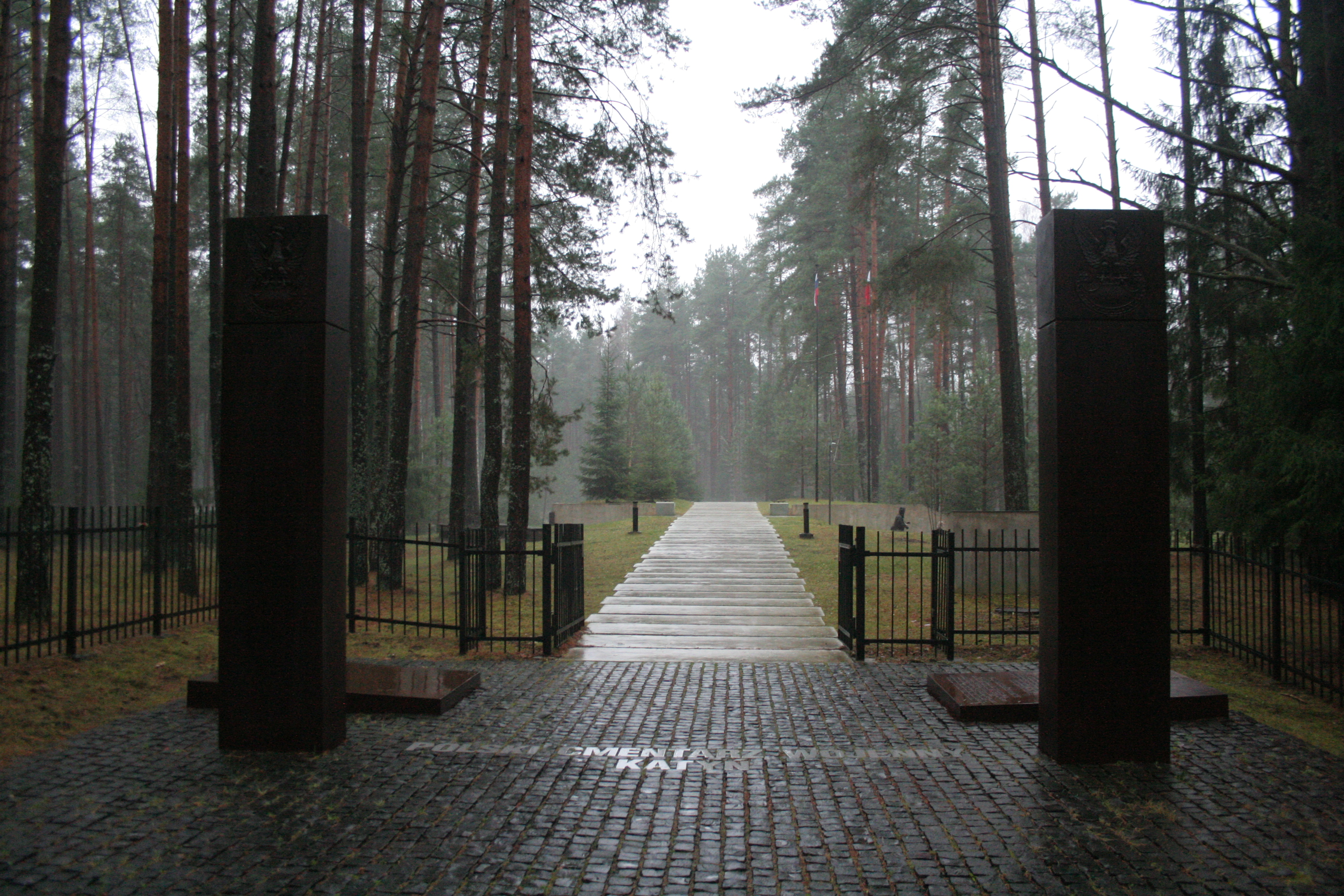
Katyn war cemetery

- Buzuluk
- Katyn war cemetery
- Koltubanka
- Mednoye, Tver Oblast
- Orenburg
- Tatishchevo
- Tatishchev Bor
- Totskoye

== Tanzania ==
- Tengeru

== Turkmenistan ==
- Ashgabat
- Krasnovodsk

== Ukraine ==
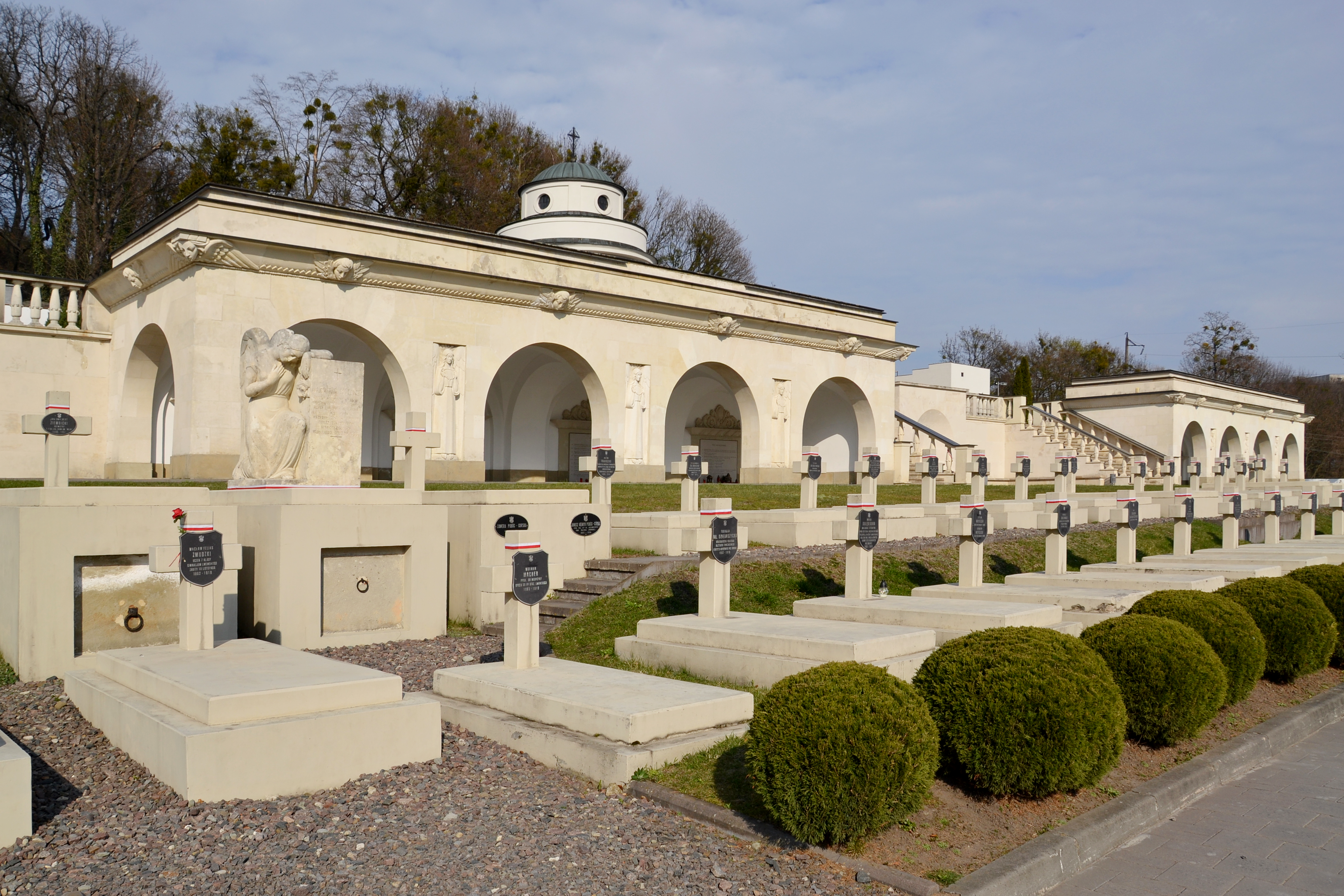
Cemetery of the Defenders of Lwów

- Victims of Totalitarianism Cemetery in Kharkiv
- Mass grave of Polish soldiers in Korets (Polish–Soviet War of 1919–1921)
- Kostiukhnivka (World War I)
- Bykivnia graves in Kyiv
- Polish military quarter at the Baikove Cemetery in Kyiv (Polish–Soviet War of 1919–1921)
- Polish military quarter at the Darnytske cemetery in Kyiv
- Polish military quarter in Lopatyn (Polish–Soviet War of 1919–1921)
- Cemetery of the Defenders of Lwów (Polish–Ukrainian War and Polish–Soviet War of 1919–1921)
- Rivne (Polish–Soviet War of 1919–1921)

== United Kingdom ==
Memorials and cemeteries:

| Location | County/Region | Constituent country | Commemorates (item(s)) |
|---|---|---|---|
| Polish War Memorial, South Ruislip | London | England | 1925 named. All other airmen from Poland who served in the Royal Air Force (walls with plaques, obelisk) (memorial garden) (gates and entrance pillars) (paired flagpoles) |
| St Clement Danes Church, Strand, near Embankment | London | England | All Polish Air Forces in Great Britain (north aisle floor motif and books of remembrance) |
| Gunnersbury Cemetery, near Chiswick | London | England | A number of buried members of forces (headstones); 22,000 killed by genocide at Katyń by Stalin and Beria's NKVD in 1940 (obelisk) |
| Main drive, Audley End House, Saffron Walden | Essex | England | 108 fallen Cichociemni – special operation paratroopers of the army in exile (large memorial) |
| Brookwood Military Cemetery, near Woking | Surrey | England | 84 buried members of forces (headstones); the Polish soldiers who died in the Second World War (large, reredo, stone eagle) |
| The Plough inn, Plumpton, near RAF Chailey | Sussex | England | Those who served at RAF Chailey (Wings 131, 302, 306, 308, 315 and 317) (tall square-based pyramid with metal plaque and surmounting eagle-turned-fighter plane) |
| The Belvedere, Hoe Park, Plymouth | Devon | England | All the Polish Navy & Merchant Fleet; including 19 named men and 3 vessels (bronze plaque on sloped granite slab with lettering in relief) |
| Polish Forces War Memorial:National Memorial Arboretum, near Lichfield | Staffordshire | England | All forces and civilians including in Poland, in four panels including one on the Warsaw Uprising (purpose-built wall monument and four-person statue) |
| Newark-on-Trent | Nottinghamshire | England | 397 (graves); large monument to all buried there (cross, tall, well-decorated) |
| Baginton, churchyard of the parish church of St John the Baptist | Warwickshire | England | War graves of 308 airmen (headstones) |
| Carl Cam's memorial garden, by ramp to T1 departures, Manchester Airport | Manchester | England | 6000 Polish officers and soldiers of the 1st Independent Polish Parachute Brigate and members of the Special Operations Executive who undertook parachute training together with nationals of Belgium, France, Holland and Norway. |
| Katyń Memorial (and Princess Parkway graves) | Manchester | England | 22,000 killed by genocide in Poland by Stalin and Beria's NKVD in 1940 |
| Liverpool quayside | Merseyside | England | All the Polish Navy & Merchant Fleet and those who gave their lives in the Battle of the Atlantic |
| Sacred Heart (RC) Church and Layton Cemetery Blackpool | Lancashire | England | Efforts, sacrifices and victories of the Polish Air Force Training Centre (church plaque); 26 war graves of Polish forces (roundabout with Cross of Sacrifice/War Cross for all 206 war graves) |
| Bradley | North Yorkshire | England | 7 airmen, crash of 23 September 1943 (plaque) (3D eagle statue above) to ashlar stone wall in stone-made, brick and gravel-floored enclosure. |
| Buckden Pike | North Yorkshire | England | 5 airmen, crash of 30 January 1942 (cross) |
| Crown Building, Cardiff | Cardiff/Glamorgan | Wales | All Polish soldiers, sailors and airmen of WWII (plaque on large, fine masonry, memorial block "stone standard") |
| Wrexham Cemetery | Wrexham/Clwyd | Wales | 40 forces members of over 1,200 Polish/British-Polish people (graves); Polish soldiers and their families at rest in Wales (memorial stone in black marble, engraved, segments in three languages) |
| Douglas | South Lanarkshire | Scotland | The 10th Brigade Polish Army and Polish Army, 1940 (three stone slabs, one of which a triangular floor slab with insignia in relief) (memorial garden) |
| Duns public park, near Berwick-on-Tweed | Borders | Scotland | 127 Polish soldiers stationed in Duns at times from 1941 to 1944, who died in battle 1944–45 (cross on square-based pyramid tall marble plinth, all of dark marble) |
| Invergordon next to road, field and woodland, near Inverness | Highland | Scotland | All people (with Polish emblems). For your and our freedom (dedicated garden enclosure with benches) (obelisk in gathered stone and mortarwork plinth with metal W-shape eagle finial gift of troops) |
| Wellshill Cemetery, Perth | Perth and Kinross | Scotland | 350 (min.) graves; eternal glory to the Polish soldiers who died for our freedom and yours (1939–45) (three massive stone blocks, surmounting each other with crest plaque and inscription in both languages) |
| Shaw Monument, Royal Air Forces Association, Prestwick | Ayrshire | Scotland | All Polish airmen stationed in Scotland; the Polish Navy, Merchant Navy and Coastal Command airmen who died in the Battle of the Atlantic (granite block) |

Furthermore, two such graves are at Yatesbury, near Swindon, Wiltshire.

== Uzbekistan ==
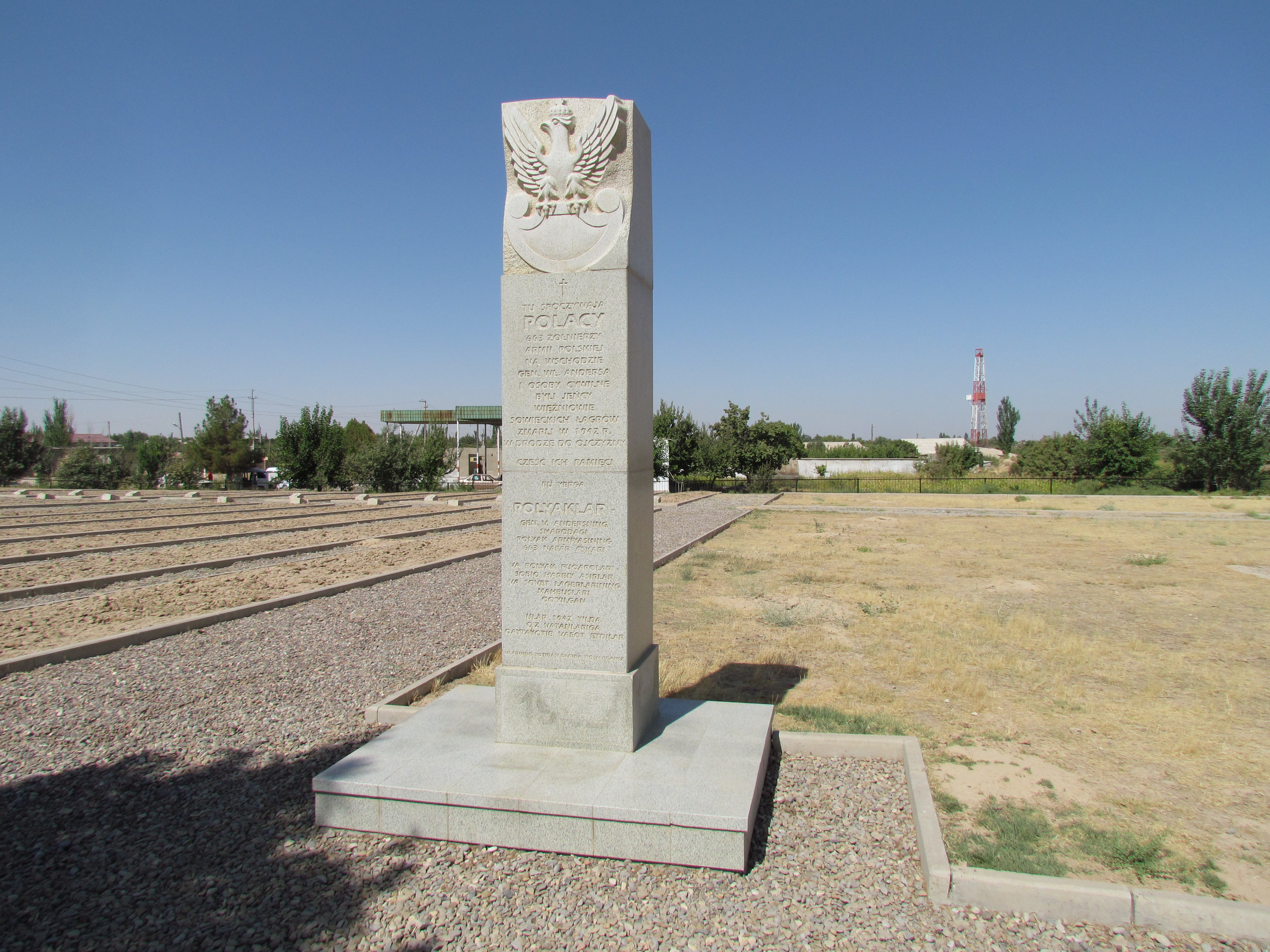
Polish War Cemetery in Gʻuzor

- Bukhara
- Chiroqchi
- Gʻuzor
- Jyzakh
- Katta Alekseyevskaya
- Kanimekh
- Karmana (2 cemeteries)
- Karkin-Batash
- Kitob
- Margelan
- Narpai
- Olmazor (2 cemeteries)
- Qarshi
- Samarkand
- Shakhrisabz
- Tashkent
- Yakkobag
- Yangi-Yul
