= Jacobsthal =

Jacobsthal is a surname. Notable people with the surname include:

- Ernst Jacobsthal (1882–1965), German mathematician
  - Jacobsthal number, an integer sequence
  - Jacobsthal sum, a finite sum of Legendre symbols
- Paul Jacobsthal (1880–1957), scholar of Greek vase painting and Celtic art
