= Rensburg =

Surname

van Rensburg is a surname. Notable people with the surname include:

- Andre van Rensburg (born 1976), South African avant-garde composer, producer and instrumentalist
- Christo van Rensburg (born 1962), former professional tennis player from South Africa
- Francois van Rensburg (born 1964), Namibian former rugby union footballer
- Johannes Van Rensburg (1898–1966), South African leader of the Ossewabrandwag
- Johnny van Rensburg (1932–2010), South African boxer of the 1950s and '60s
- Jurinus Janse van Rensburg SD SM MMM (born 1952), South African military commander
- Kobie van Rensburg (born 1969), South African tenor and opera director
- Johannes Jacobus (Lang Hans) Janse van Rensburg (1779–1836), leader of a failed voortrekker expedition
- Nico van Rensburg (born 1966), South African professional golfer
- Patrick van Rensburg (1931–2017), African educationalist and former anti-apartheid activist
- Reinardt Janse van Rensburg (born 1989), South African cyclist
- Rhyno Janse van Rensburg, (born 1991), South African cricketer
- Shawn van Rensburg, former Wales international rugby union player
- Siener van Rensburg (1862–1926), Boer prophet from the South African Republic
- Willem Cornelis Janse van Rensburg (1818–1865), the Second President of the South African Republic, from 1863 to 1864
- William G. L. Janse van Rensburg (1939–2008), mayor of the city of Johannesburg, South Africa, from 1990 to 1991

== See also ==
- Janse van Rensburg
- Rensburg, a city in Gauteng, South Africa (near Heidelberg)
