= Cyclotomic fast Fourier transform =

The cyclotomic fast Fourier transform is a type of fast Fourier transform algorithm over finite fields. This algorithm first decomposes a discrete Fourier transform into several circular convolutions. This then derives the discrete Fourier transform results from the circular convolution results. When applied to a discrete Fourier transform over $\mathrm{GF}(2^m)$, this algorithm has a very low multiplicative complexity. In practice, since there usually exist efficient algorithms for circular convolutions with specific lengths, this algorithm is very efficient.

== Background ==
The discrete Fourier transform over finite fields finds widespread application in the decoding of error-correcting codes such as BCH codes and Reed–Solomon codes. Generalized from the complex field, a discrete Fourier transform of a sequence $\{f_i\}_{0}^{N-1}$ over a finite field $\mathrm{GF}(p^m)$ is defined as
$$F_j=\sum_{i=0}^{N-1}f_i\alpha^{ij}, 0\le j\le N-1,$$
where $\alpha$ is the N-th primitive root of 1 in $\mathrm{GF}(p^m)$. If the polynomial representation of $\{f_i\}_{0}^{N-1}$ is defined as
$$f(x) = f_0+f_1x+f_2x^2+\cdots+f_{N-1}x^{N-1}=\sum_{0}^{N-1}f_ix^i,$$
it is easy to see that $F_j$ is simply $f(\alpha^j)$. That is, the discrete Fourier transform of a sequence converts it to a polynomial evaluation problem.

Written in matrix format,
$$\mathbf{F}=\left[\begin{matrix}F_0\\F_1\\ \vdots \\ F_{N-1}\end{matrix}\right]=
\left[\begin{matrix}
\alpha^0&\alpha^0 &\cdots & \alpha^0\\
\alpha^0 & \alpha^1 &\cdots &\alpha^{N-1}\\
\vdots &\vdots & \ddots & \vdots \\
\alpha^{0} & \alpha^{N-1} &\cdots & \alpha^{(N-1)(N-1)}
\end{matrix}\right]
\left[\begin{matrix}f_0\\f_1\\\vdots\\f_{N-1}\end{matrix}\right]=\mathcal{F}\mathbf{f}.$$

Direct evaluation of the discrete Fourier transform has an $O(N^2)$ complexity. Fast Fourier transforms are just efficient algorithms evaluating the above matrix-vector product.

== Algorithm ==
First, define a linearized polynomial over $\mathrm{GF}(p^m)$ as
$$L(x) = \sum_{i} l_i x^{p^i}, l_i \in \mathrm{GF}(p^m).$$
Here $L(x)$ is called linearized, because $L(x_1+x_2) = L(x_1) + L(x_2)$, which comes from the fact that for elements $x_1,x_2 \in \mathrm{GF}(p^m)$ and $(x_1+x_2)^p=x_1^p+x_2^p$.

Notice that $p$ is invertible modulo $N$ because $N$ must divide the order $p^m-1$ of the multiplicative group of the field $\mathrm{GF}(p^m)$. So, the elements $\{0, 1, 2, \ldots, N-1\}$ can be partitioned into $l+1$ cyclotomic cosets modulo $N$:
$$\begin{align}
&\{0\}, \\
&\{k_1, pk_1, p^2k_1, \ldots, p^{m_1-1}k_1\}, \\
&\ldots, \\
&\{k_l, pk_l, p^2k_l, \ldots, p^{m_l-1}k_l\},
\end{align}$$
where $k_i=p^{m_i}k_i \pmod{N}$. Therefore, the input to the Fourier transform can be rewritten as
$$f(x)=\sum_{i=0}^l L_i(x^{k_i}),\quad L_i(y) = \sum_{t=0}^{m_i-1}y^{p^t}f_{p^tk_i\bmod{N}}.$$

In this way, the polynomial representation is decomposed into a sum of linear polynomials. Hence, $F_j$ is given by
$$F_j=f(\alpha^j)=\sum_{i=0}^lL_i(\alpha^{jk_i})$$
. Expanding $\alpha^{jk_i} \in \mathrm{GF}(p^{m_i})$ with the proper basis $\{\beta_{i,0}, \beta_{i,1}, \ldots, \beta_{i,m_i-1}\}$ yields $\alpha^{jk_i} = \sum_{s=0}^{m_i-1}a_{ijs}\beta_{i,s}$, where $a_{ijs} \in \mathrm{GF}(p)$. By the property of the linearized polynomial $L_i(x)$, this yields
$$F_j=\sum_{i=0}^l\sum_{s=0}^{m_i-1}a_{ijs}\left(\sum_{t=0}^{m_i-1}\beta_{i,s}^{p^t}f_{p^{t}k_i\bmod{N}}\right).$$

This equation can be rewritten in matrix form as $\mathbf{F}=\mathbf{AL\Pi f}$, where $\mathbf{A}$ is an $N\times N$ matrix over $\mathrm{GF}(p)$ that contains the elements $a_{ijs}$, $\mathbf{L}$ is a block diagonal matrix, and $\mathbf{\Pi}$ is a permutation matrix regrouping the elements in $\mathbf{f}$ according to the cyclotomic coset index.

Note that if the normal basis $\{\gamma_i^{p^0}, \gamma_i^{p^1}, \cdots, \gamma_i^{p^{m_i-1}}\}$ is used to expand the field elements of $\mathrm{GF}(p^{m_i})$, the i-th block of $\mathbf{L}$ is given by:
$$\mathbf{L}_i=
\begin{bmatrix}
\gamma_i^{p^0}  &\gamma_i^{p^1}  &\cdots  &\gamma_i^{p^{m_i-1}}\\
\gamma_i^{p^1}  &\gamma_i^{p^2}  &\cdots  &\gamma_i^{p^{0}}\\
\vdots & \vdots & \ddots & \vdots\\
\gamma_i^{p^{m_i-1}}  &\gamma_i^{p^0}  &\cdots  &\gamma_i^{p^{m_i-2}}\\
\end{bmatrix},$$
which is a circulant matrix. It is well known that a circulant matrix-vector product can be efficiently computed by convolutions. Hence, it is successful to reduce the discrete Fourier transform into short convolutions.

== Complexity ==
When applied to a characteristic-2 field $\mathrm{GF}(2^m)$, the matrix $\mathbf{A}$ is just a binary matrix. Only addition is used when calculating the matrix-vector product of $\mathrm{A}$ and $\mathrm{L\Pi f}$. It has been shown that the multiplicative complexity of the cyclotomic algorithm is given by $O(n(\log_2n)^{\log_2\frac{3}{2}})$, and the additive complexity is given by $O(n^2/(\log_2 n)^{\log_2\frac{8}{3}})$.
