= Janse van Rensburg =

Janse van Rensburg is a South African double surname. Notable people sharing this surname include:

- Benhard Janse van Rensburg (born 1997), South African rugby union player
- Brent Janse van Rensburg (born 1980), South African rugby union coach
- Hector Janse van Rensburg (born 1993), British painter
- Jacques Janse van Rensburg (born 1987), South African cyclist
- JC Janse van Rensburg (born 1986), South African rugby union footballer
- Jennifer Janse van Rensburg (born 1993), German ice dancer
- Johannes Frederik Janse van Rensburg (1898–1966), South African lawyer
- Jono Janse van Rensburg (born 1989), South African rugby union player
- Jurinus Janse van Rensburg (born 1952), South African military commander
- Lang Hans Janse van Rensburg (1779–1836), South African leader
- Libbie Janse van Rensburg (born 1994), South African rugby union and sevens player
- Nico Janse van Rensburg (born 1994), South African rugby union player
- Reinardt Janse van Rensburg (born 1989), South African road bicycle racer
- Rohan Janse van Rensburg (born 1994), South African rugby union player
- Rhyno Janse van Rensburg (born 1991), South African cricketer
- Siener Janse van Rensburg (1864–1926), South African prophet
- Willem Cornelis Janse van Rensburg (1818–1865), South African politician
- William G. L. Janse van Rensburg (1939–2008), mayor of Johannesburg
