= Brewer sum =

Character sums related to Jacobsthal sums

In mathematics, Brewer sums are finite character sums introduced by Brewer related to Jacobsthal sums.

Let $a\in \Z/q\Z$, with $q$ a power of some prime $p$. The Brewer sum is defined as

$$\Lambda_n(a) = \sum_{x\bmod p}\bigg(\frac{D_{n+1}(x,a)}{p}\bigg)$$,

where $(\frac{\;}{\;})$ is the Legendre symbol and $D_n$ is the Dickson polynomial given by

$$D_{0}(x,a)=2,\quad D_1(x,a)=x,  \quad D_{n+1}(x,a)=xD_n(x,a)-aD_{n-1}(x,a)$$.

The Brewer sum is zero when $n$ is coprime to $q^2-1$.
