= QPP =

QPP may refer to:

- Quadratic permutation polynomial
- Quebec Pension Plan (QPP)
- Queensland People's Party
- Queerplatonic partnership
- Sûreté du Québec, sometimes referred to in English as "Quebec Provincial Police"
