= Christine O'Keefe =

Australian mathematician

Christine Margaret O'Keefe is an Australian mathematician and computer scientist whose research has included work in finite geometry, information security, and data privacy. She is a researcher at CSIRO, and was the lead author of a 2017 report from the Office of the Australian Information Commissioner on best practices for de-identification of personally identifying data.

== Education and career ==
O'Keefe has a bachelor's degree from the University of Adelaide, initially intending to study medicine but earning first-class honours in mathematics there in 1982. She returned to Adelaide for doctoral study in 1985, and completed her Ph.D. in 1988. Her dissertation, Concerning $t$-spreads of $PG((s+1)(t+1)-1,q)$, was supervised by Rey Casse.

She was a lecturer and research fellow at the University of Western Australia from 1999 to 2001, when she returned to the University of Adelaide. At Adelaide, she worked as a lecturer, senior lecturer, Queen Elizabeth II Fellow, and senior research fellow.

Her research interests shifted from finite geometry to information security and to effect that shift she moved in 2000 from Adelaide to CSIRO. At CSIRO, she founded the Information Security and Privacy Group in 2002, became head of the Health Informatics Group in 2004, became Theme Leader for Health Data and Information in 2006, and Strategic Operations Director for Preventative Health National Research in 2008.

While doing this, she studied for an MBA at Australian National University, finishing in 2008. She became Director of the Population Health Research Network Centre and Professor of Health Sciences at Curtin University from 2009 to 2010 before returning to CSIRO as Science Leader for Privacy and Confidentiality in the CSIRO Department of Mathematics, Informatics and Statistics.

== Recognition ==
O'Keefe has been a Fellow of the Institute of Combinatorics and its Applications since 1991. In 1996, O'Keefe won the Hall Medal of the Institute of Combinatorics and its Applications for her work in finite geometry. She won the Australian Mathematical Society Medal in 2000, the first woman to win the medal, and in the same year became a Fellow of the Australian Mathematical Society. Although the Medal citation primarily discussed O'Keefe's work in finite geometry, such as the discovery of new hyperovals, it included a paragraph on her research using geometry in secret sharing, a precursor to her later work on information security.
