= Arc (projective geometry) =

The red points are a 4-arc in Fano plane, the projective plane of order 2.

A (simple) arc in finite projective geometry is a set of points which satisfies, in an intuitive way, a feature of curved figures in continuous geometries. Loosely speaking, they are sets of points that are far from "line-like" in a plane or far from "plane-like" in a three-dimensional space. In this finite setting it is typical to include the number of points in the set in the name, so these simple arcs are called k-arcs. An important generalization of k-arcs, also referred to as arcs in the literature, is the (k, d)-arcs.

== k-arcs in a projective plane ==
In a finite projective plane π (not necessarily Desarguesian) a set A of k (k ≥ 3) points such that no three points of A are collinear (on a line) is called a k - arc. If the plane π has order q then k ≤ q + 2, however the maximum value of k can only be achieved if q is even. In a plane of order q, a (q + 1)-arc is called an oval and, if q is even, a (q + 2)-arc is called a hyperoval.

Every conic in the Desarguesian projective plane PG(2,q), i.e., the set of zeros of an irreducible homogeneous quadratic equation, is an oval. A celebrated result of Beniamino Segre states that when q is odd, every (q + 1)-arc in PG(2,q) is a conic (Segre's theorem). This is one of the pioneering results in finite geometry.

If q is even and A is a (q + 1)-arc in π, then it can be shown via combinatorial arguments that there must exist a unique point in π (called the nucleus of A) such that the union of A and this point is a (q + 2)-arc. Thus, every oval can be uniquely extended to a hyperoval in a finite projective plane of even order.

A k-arc which can not be extended to a larger arc is called a complete arc. In the Desarguesian projective planes, PG(2,q), no q-arc is complete, so they may all be extended to ovals.

== k-arcs in a projective space ==
In the finite projective space PG(n, q) with n ≥ 3, a set A of k ≥ n + 1 points such that no n + 1 points lie in a common hyperplane is called a (spatial) k-arc. This definition generalizes the definition of a k-arc in a plane (where n = 2).

== (k, d)-arcs in a projective plane ==
A (k, d)-arc (k, d > 1) in a finite projective plane π (not necessarily Desarguesian) is a set, A of k points of π such that each line intersects A in at most d points, and there is at least one line that does intersect A in d points. A (k, 2)-arc is a k-arc and may be referred to as simply an arc if the size is not a concern.

The number of points k of a (k, d)-arc A in a projective plane of order q is at most qd + d − q. When equality occurs, one calls A a maximal arc.

Hyperovals are maximal arcs. Complete arcs need not be maximal arcs.

== See also ==
- Normal rational curve
