= Oval (projective plane) =

Circle-like pointset in a geometric plane

To the definition of an oval: e: exterior (passing) line, t: tangent, s: secant

In projective geometry an oval is a point set in a plane that is defined by incidence properties. The standard examples are the nondegenerate conics. However, a conic is only defined in a pappian plane, whereas an oval may exist in any type of projective plane. In the literature, there are many criteria which imply that an oval is a conic, but there are many examples, both infinite and finite, of ovals in pappian planes which are not conics.

As mentioned, in projective geometry an oval is defined by incidence properties, but in other areas, ovals may be defined to satisfy other criteria, for instance, in differential geometry by differentiability conditions in the real plane.

The higher dimensional analog of an oval is an ovoid in a projective space.

A generalization of the oval concept is an abstract oval, which is a structure that is not necessarily embedded in a projective plane. Indeed, there exist abstract ovals which can not lie in any projective plane.

== Definition of an oval ==
- In a projective plane a set Ω of points is called an oval, if:
1. Any line l meets Ω in at most two points, and
2. For any point P ∈ Ω there exists exactly one tangent line t through P, i.e., t ∩ Ω = {P}.

When |l ∩ Ω| = 0 the line l is an exterior line (or passant), if |l ∩ Ω| = 1 a tangent line and if |l ∩ Ω| = 2 the line is a secant line.

For finite planes (i.e. the set of points is finite) we have a more convenient characterization:

- For a finite projective plane of order n (i.e. any line contains n + 1 points) a set Ω of points is an oval if and only if |Ω| = n + 1 and no three points are collinear (on a common line).

A set of points in an affine plane satisfying the above definition is called an affine oval.

An affine oval is always a projective oval in the projective closure (adding a line at infinity) of the underlying affine plane.

An oval can also be considered as a special quadratic set.

== Examples ==
=== Conic sections ===
projective conic in inhomogeneous coordinates: parabola plus point at infinity of the axis

projective conic in inhomogeneous coordinates: hyperbola plus points at infinity of the asymptotes

In any pappian projective plane there exist nondegenerate projective conic sections and any nondegenerate projective conic section is an oval. This statement can be verified by a straightforward calculation for any of the conics (such as the parabola or hyperbola).

Non-degenerate conics are ovals with special properties:

- Pascal's Theorem and its various degenerations are valid.
- There are many projectivities which leave a conic invariant.

=== Ovals which are not conics ===
in the real plane

1. If one glues one half of a circle and a half of an ellipse smoothly together, one gets a non-conic oval.
2. If one takes the inhomogeneous representation of a conic oval as a parabola plus a point at infinity and replaces the expression x^{2} by x^{4}, one gets an oval which is not a conic.
3. If one takes the inhomogeneous representation of a conic oval as a hyperbola plus two points at infinity and replaces the expression 1/x by 1/x^{3}, one gets an oval which is not a conic.
4. The implicit curve x^{4} + y^{4} = 1 is a non conic oval.

in a finite plane of even order

1. In a finite pappian plane of even order a nondegenerate conic has a nucleus (a single point through which every tangent passes), which can be exchanged with any point of the conic to obtain an oval which is not a conic.
2. For the field K = GF(2^{m}) with 2^{m} elements let

$$\Omega=\{(x,y)\in K^2 \; | y=x^{2^k}\; \} \; \cup \; \{(\infty)\}$$
For k ∈ {2,...,m − 1} and k and m coprime, the set Ω is an oval which is not a conic.

Further finite examples can be found here:

== Criteria for an oval to be a conic ==
For an oval to be a conic the oval and/or the plane has to fulfill additional conditions. Here are some results:

1. An oval in an arbitrary projective plane, which fulfills the incidence condition of Pascal's theorem or the 5-point degeneration of it, is a nondegenerate conic.
2. If Ω is an oval in a pappian projective plane and the group of projectivities which leave Ω invariant is 3-transitive, i.e. for 2 triples A_{1}, A_{2}, A_{3} ; B_{1}, B_{2}, B_{3} of points there exists a projectivity π with π(A_{i}) = B_{i}, i = 1,2,3. In the finite case 2-transitive is sufficient.
3. An oval Ω in a pappian projective plane of characteristic ≠ 2 is a conic if and only if for any point P of a tangent there is an involutory perspectivity (symmetry) with center P which leaves Ω invariant.
4. If Ω is an oval in a finite Desarguesian (pappian) projective plane of odd order, PG(2, q), then Ω is a conic by Segre's theorem.). This implies that, after a possible change of coordinates, every oval of PG(2, q) with q odd has the parametrization :

$$\{(t,t^2,1)\mid t\in GF(q)\}\cup \{(0,1,0)\}.$$

For topological ovals the following simple criteria holds:

5. Any closed oval of the complex projective plane is a conic.

== Further results on ovals in finite planes ==
An oval in a finite projective plane of order q is a (q + 1, 2)-arc, in other words, a set of q + 1 points, no three collinear. Ovals in the Desarguesian (pappian) projective plane PG(2, q) for q odd are just the nonsingular conics. However, ovals in PG(2, q) for q even have not yet been classified.

In an arbitrary finite projective plane of odd order q, no sets with more points than q + 1, no three of which are collinear, exist, as first pointed out by Bose in a 1947 paper on applications of this sort of mathematics to the statistical design of experiments. Furthermore, by Qvist's theorem, through any point not on an oval there pass either zero or two tangent lines of that oval.

A hyperoval (the 4 red points) in the 7 point Fano plane.

When q is even, the situation is completely different.

In this case, sets of q + 2 points, no three of which collinear, may exist in a finite projective plane of order q and they are called hyperovals; these are maximal arcs of degree 2.

Given an oval there is a unique tangent through each point, and if q is even then Qvist's theorem shows that all these tangents are concurrent in a point P outside the oval. Adding this point (called the nucleus of the oval or sometimes the knot) to the oval gives a hyperoval. Conversely, removing any one point from a hyperoval immediately gives an oval.

As all ovals in the even order case are contained in hyperovals, a description of the (known) hyperovals implicitly gives all (known) ovals. The ovals obtained by removing a point from a hyperoval are projectively equivalent if and only if the removed points are in the same orbit of the automorphism group of the hyperoval. There are only three small examples (in the Desarguesian planes) where the automorphism group of the hyperoval is transitive on its points so, in general, there are different types of ovals contained in a single hyperoval.

=== Desarguesian Case: PG(2,2^{h}) ===
This is the most studied case and so the most is known about these hyperovals.

Every nonsingular conic in the projective plane, together with its nucleus, forms a hyperoval. These may be called hyperconics, but the more traditional term is regular hyperovals. For each of these sets, there is a system of coordinates such that the set is:

$$\{(t,t^2,1)\mid t\in GF(q)\}\cup \{(0,1,0)\}\cup\{(1,0,0)\}.$$

However, many other types of hyperovals of PG(2, q) can be found if q > 8. Hyperovals of PG(2, q) for q even have only been classified for q < 64 to date.

In PG(2,2^{h}), h > 0, a hyperoval contains at least four points no three of which are collinear. Thus, by the Fundamental Theorem of Projective Geometry we can always assume that the points with projective coordinates (1,0,0), (0,1,0), (0,0,1) and (1,1,1) are contained in any hyperoval. The remaining points of the hyperoval (when h > 1) will have the form (t, f(t),1) where t ranges through the values of the finite field GF(2^{h}) and f is a function on that field which represents a permutation and can be uniquely expressed as a polynomial of degree at most 2^{h} - 2, i.e. it is a permutation polynomial. Notice that f(0) = 0 and f(1) = 1 are forced by the assumption concerning the inclusion of the specified points. Other restrictions on f are forced by the no three points collinear condition. An f which produces a hyperoval in this way is called an o-polynomial. The following table lists all the known hyperovals (as of 2011) of PG(2,2^{h}) by giving the o-polynomial and any restrictions on the value of h that are necessary for the displayed function to be an o-polynomial. Note that all exponents are to be taken mod(2^{h} - 1).

=== Known Hyperovals in PG(2,2^{h}) ===
Name	O-Polynomial	Field Restriction	Reference
Hyperconic	f(t) = t^{2}	None	Classical
Translation	$f(t) = t^{2^i}$ (i,h) = 1	None	(Segre 1962)
Segre	f(t) = t^{6}	h odd	(Segre 1962); (Segre & Bartocci 1971)
Glynn I	f(t) = t^{3σ+4} (see below)	h odd	(Glynn 1983)
Glynn II	f(t) = t^{σ+γ} (see below)	h odd	(Glynn 1983)
Payne	f(t) = t^{1/6}+t^{1/2}+t^{5/6}	h odd	(Payne 1985)
Cherowitzo	f(t) = t^{σ} + t^{σ+2} + t^{3σ+4}	h odd	(Cherowitzo 1988); (Cherowitzo 1998)
Subiaco	see a) below	None	(Cherowitzo et al. 1996)
Adelaide	see b) below	h even	(Cherowitzo, O'Keefe & Penttila 2003)
Penttila-O'Keefe	see c) below	h = 5	(O'Keefe & Penttila 1992)
where $\gamma^4 \equiv \sigma^2 \equiv 2 (\bmod(2^h - 1))$.

^{a)} The Subiaco o-polynomial is given by: $f(t) = {{d^2 t^4 + d^2(1 + d + d^2) t^3 + d^2(1 + d + d^2)t^2 + d^2 t} \over {t^4 + d^2 t^2 + 1}} + t^{1/2},$ whenever $tr(1/d) = 1 \hbox { and }d \not\in GF(4) \hbox{ if } h \equiv 2 (\bmod 4)$, where tr is the absolute trace function of GF(2^{h}). This o-polynomial gives rise to a unique hyperoval if $h \not\equiv 2 (\bmod 4)$ and to two inequivalent hyperovals if $h \equiv 2 (\bmod 4), h > 2$.

^{b)} To describe the Adelaide hyperovals, we will start in a slightly more general setting. Let F = GF(q) and K = GF(q^{2}). Let $b \in K$ be an element of norm 1, different from 1, i.e. b^{q+1} = 1, $b \neq 1$. Consider the polynomial, for $t \in F$,

f(t) = (tr(b))^{−1}tr(b^{m})(t + 1) + (tr(b))^{−1}tr((bt + b^{q})^{m})(t + tr(b)t^{½}+ 1)^{1−m} + t^{½},

where tr(x) = tr_{K/F}(x) = x + x^{q}. When q = 2^{h}, with h even and m = ±(q - 1)/3, the above f(t) is an o-polynomial for the Adelaide hyperoval.

^{c)} The Penttila-O'Keefe o-polynomial is given by:

f(t) = t^{4} + t^{16} + t^{28} + η^{11}(t^{6} + t^{10} + t^{14} + t^{18} + t^{22} + t^{26}) + η^{20}(t^{8} + t^{20}) + η^{6}(t^{12} + t^{24}),

where η is a primitive root of GF(32) satisfying η^{5} = η^{2} + 1.

=== Hyperovals in PG(2, q), q even, q ≤ 64 ===
As the hyperovals in the Desarguesian planes of orders 2, 4 and 8 are all hyperconics we shall only examine the planes of orders 16, 32 and 64.

==== PG(2,16) ====
In (Lunelli & Sce 1958) the details of a computer search for complete arcs in small order planes carried out at the suggestion of B. Segre are given. In PG(2,16) they found a number of hyperovals which were not hyperconics. In 1975, M. Hall Jr. showed, also with considerable aid from a computer, that there were only two classes of projectively inequivalent hyperovals in this plane, the hyperconics and the hyperovals found by Lunelli and Sce. Out of the 2040 o-polynomials which give the Lunelli-Sce hyperoval, we display only one:

f(x) = x^{12} + x^{10} + η^{11}x^{8} + x^{6} + η^{2}x^{4} + η^{9}x^{2},

where η is a primitive element of GF(16) satisfying η^{4} = η + 1.

In his 1975 paper Hall described a number of collineations of the plane which stabilized the Lunelli-Sce hyperoval, but did not show that they generated the full automorphism group of this hyperoval. Payne & Conklin (1978) using properties of a related generalized quadrangle, showed that the automorphism group could be no larger than the group given by Hall. Korchmáros (1978) independently gave a constructive proof of this result and also showed that in Desarguesian planes, the Lunelli-Sce hyperoval is the unique irregular hyperoval (non-hyperconic) admitting a transitive automorphism group (and that the only hyperconics admitting such a group are those of orders 2 and 4).

O'Keefe & Penttila (1991) reproved Hall's classification result without the use of a computer. Their argument consists of finding an upper bound on the number of o-polynomials defined over GF(16) and then, by examining the possible automorphism groups of hyperovals in this plane, showing that if a hyperoval other than the known ones existed in this plane then the upper bound would be exceeded. Brown & Cherowitzo (2000) provides a group-theoretic construction of the Lunelli-Sce hyperoval as the union of orbits of the group generated by the elations of PGU(3,4) considered as a subgroup of PGL(3,16). Also included in this paper is a discussion of some remarkable properties concerning the intersections of Lunelli-Sce hyperovals and hyperconics. In Cherowitzo et al. (1996) it is shown that the Lunelli-Sce hyperoval is the first non-trivial member of theSubiaco family In Cherowitzo, O'Keefe & Penttila (2003) it is shown to be the first non-trivial member of the Adelaide family.

==== PG(2,32) ====
Since h = 5 is odd, a number of the known families have a representative here, but due to the small size of the plane there are some spurious equivalences, in fact, each of the Glynn type hyperovals is projectively equivalent to a translation hyperoval, and the Payne hyperoval is projectively equivalent to the Subiaco hyperoval (this does not occur in larger planes). Specifically, there are three classes of (monomial type) hyperovals, the hyperconics (f(t) = t^{2}), proper translation hyperovals (f(t) = t^{4}) and the Segre hyperovals (f(t) = t^{6}). There are also classes corresponding to the Payne hyperovals and the Cherowitzo hyperovals. In O'Keefe, Penttila & Praeger (1991) the collineation groups stabilizing each of these hyperovals have been determined. Note that in the original determination of the collineation group for the Payne hyperovals the case of q = 32 had to be treated separately and relied heavily on computer results. In O'Keefe, Penttila & Praeger (1991) an alternative version of the proof is given which does not depend on computer computations.

In 1991, O'Keefe and Penttila discovered a new hyperoval in this plane by means of a detailed investigation of the divisibility properties of the orders of automorphism groups of hypothetical hyperovals. One of its o-polynomials is given by:

f(x) = x^{4} + x^{16} + x^{28} + η^{11}(x^{6} + x^{10} + x^{14} + x^{18} + x^{22} + x^{26}) + η^{20}(x^{8} + x^{20}) + η^{6}(x^{12} + x^{24}),

where η is a primitive root of GF(32) satisfying η^{5} = η^{2} + 1. The full automorphism group of this hyperoval has order 3.

Penttila & Royle (1994) cleverly structured an exhaustive computer search for all hyperovals in this plane. The result was that the above listing is complete, there are just six classes of hyperovals in PG(2,32).

==== PG(2,64) ====
By extending the ideas in O'Keefe & Penttila (1992) to PG(2,64), Penttila & Pinneri (1994) were able to search for hyperovals whose automorphism group admitted a collineation of order 5. They found two and showed that no other hyperoval exists in this plane that has such an automorphism. This settled affirmatively a long open question of B. Segre who wanted to know if there were any hyperovals in this plane besides the hyperconics. The hyperovals are:

f(x) = x^{8} + x^{12} + x^{20} + x^{22} + x^{42} + x^{52} + η^{21}(x^{4}+x^{10}+x^{14}+x^{16}+x^{30}+x^{38}+x^{44}+x^{48}+x^{54}+x^{56}+x^{58}+x^{60}+x^{62}) + η^{42}(x^{2} + x^{6} + x^{26} + x^{28} + x^{32} + x^{36} + x^{40}),

which has an automorphism group of order 15, and

f(x) = x^{24} + x^{30} + x^{62} + η^{21}(x^{4} +x^{8}+x^{10}+x^{14}+x^{16}+x^{34}+x^{38} +x^{40} +x^{44}+x^{46}+x^{52}+x^{54}+x^{58}+x^{60}) + η^{42}(x^{6}+ x^{12}+ x^{18}+ x^{20}+ x^{26}+ x^{32} + x^{36}+ x^{42}+ x^{48}+x^{50}),

which has an automorphism group of order 60, where η is a primitive element of GF(64) satisfying η^{6} = η + 1. In Cherowitzo et al. (1996) it is shown that these are Subiaco hyperovals. By refining the computer search program, Penttila & Royle (1994) extended the search to hyperovals admitting an automorphism of order 3, and found the hyperoval:

f(x) = x^{4} + x^{8} + x^{14} + x^{34} + x^{42} + x^{48} + x^{62} + η^{21}(x^{6}+x^{16} +x^{26}+x^{28}+x^{30}+x^{32}+x^{40}+x^{58}) + η^{42}(x^{10} + x^{18} + x^{24} + x^{36} + x^{44} + x^{50} + x^{52}+ x^{60}),

which has an automorphism group of order 12 (η is a primitive element of GF(64) as above). This hyperoval is the first distinct Adelaide hyperoval.

Penttila and Royle have shown that any other hyperoval in this plane would have to have a trivial automorphism group. This would mean that there would be many projectively equivalent copies of such a hyperoval, but general searches to date have found none, giving credence to the conjecture that there are no others in this plane.

== Abstract ovals ==
Following (Bue1966), an abstract oval, also called a B-oval, of order $n$ is a pair $(F,{\mathfrak G})$ where $F$ is a set of $n+1$ elements, called points, and ${\mathfrak G}$ is a set of involutions acting on $F$ in a sharply quasi 2-transitive way, that is, for any two $(a_1,a_2),(b_1,b_2)\in F$ with $a_i\neq b_j$ for $i,j\in\{1,2\}$, there exists exactly one $\sigma\in {\mathfrak G}$ with $\sigma(a_1)=a_2$ and $\sigma(b_1)=b_2$. Any oval embedded in a projective plane of order $q$ might be endowed with a structure of an abstract oval of the same order. The converse is, in general, not true for $n\geq 8$; indeed, for $n=8$ there are two abstract ovals which may not be embedded in a projective plane, see (Fa1984).

When $n$ is even, a similar construction yields abstract hyperovals, see (Po1997): an abstract hyperoval of order $n$ is a pair $(F,{\mathfrak G})$ where $F$ is a set of $n+2$ elements and ${\mathfrak G}$ is a set of fixed-point free involutions acting on $F$ such that for any set of four distinct elements $a,b,c,d\in F$ there is exactly one $\sigma\in{\mathfrak G}$ with $\sigma(a)=b, \sigma(c)=d$.

== See also ==
- Ovoid (projective geometry)
