= Dickson polynomial =

In mathematics, the Dickson polynomials, denoted D_{n}(x,α), form a polynomial sequence introduced by L. E. Dickson (1897). They were rediscovered by Brewer (1961) in his study of Brewer sums and have at times, although rarely, been referred to as Brewer polynomials.

Over the complex numbers, Dickson polynomials are essentially equivalent to Chebyshev polynomials with a change of variable, and, in fact, Dickson polynomials are sometimes called Chebyshev polynomials.

Dickson polynomials are generally studied over finite fields, where they sometimes may not be equivalent to Chebyshev polynomials. One of the main reasons for interest in them is that for fixed α, they give many examples of permutation polynomials; polynomials acting as permutations of finite fields.

== Definition ==
=== First kind ===
For integer n > 0 and α in a commutative ring R with identity (often chosen to be the finite field F_{q} = GF(q)) the Dickson polynomials (of the first kind) over R are given by

$$D_n(x,\alpha)=\sum_{i=0}^{\left\lfloor \frac{n}{2} \right\rfloor}\frac{n}{n-i} \binom{n-i}{i} (-\alpha)^i x^{n-2i} \,.$$

The first few Dickson polynomials are

$$\begin{align}
D_1(x,\alpha) &= x \\
D_2(x,\alpha) &= x^2 - 2\alpha \\
D_3(x,\alpha) &= x^3 - 3x\alpha \\
D_4(x,\alpha) &= x^4 - 4x^2\alpha + 2\alpha^2 \\
D_5(x,\alpha) &= x^5 - 5x^3\alpha + 5x\alpha^2 \,.
\end{align}$$

They may also be generated by the recurrence relation for n ≥ 2,

$$D_n(x,\alpha) = xD_{n-1}(x,\alpha)-\alpha D_{n-2}(x,\alpha) \,,$$

with the initial conditions D_{0}(x,α) = 2 and D_{1}(x,α) = x.

The coefficients are given at several places in the OEIS with minute differences for the first two terms.

=== Second kind ===
The Dickson polynomials of the second kind, E_{n}(x,α), are defined by

$$E_n(x,\alpha)=\sum_{i=0}^{\left\lfloor \frac{n}{2} \right\rfloor}\binom{n-i}{i} (-\alpha)^i x^{n-2i}.$$

They have not been studied much, and have properties similar to those of Dickson polynomials of the first kind. The first few Dickson polynomials of the second kind are

$$\begin{align}
E_0(x,\alpha) &= 1 \\
E_1(x,\alpha) &= x \\
E_2(x,\alpha) &= x^2 - \alpha \\
E_3(x,\alpha) &= x^3 - 2x\alpha \\
E_4(x,\alpha) &= x^4 - 3x^2\alpha + \alpha^2 \,.
\end{align}$$

They may also be generated by the recurrence relation for n ≥ 2,

$$E_n(x,\alpha) = xE_{n-1}(x,\alpha)-\alpha E_{n-2}(x,\alpha) \,,$$

with the initial conditions E_{0}(x,α) = 1 and E_{1}(x,α) = x.

The coefficients are also given in the OEIS.

== Properties ==
The D_{n} are the unique monic polynomials satisfying the functional equation

$$D_n\left(u + \frac{\alpha}{u},\alpha\right) = u^n + \left(\frac{\alpha}{u}\right)^n,$$

where α ∈ F_{q} and u ≠ 0 ∈ F_{q^{2}}.

They also satisfy a composition rule,

$$D_{mn}(x,\alpha) = D_m\bigl(D_n(x,\alpha),\alpha^n\bigr) \,= D_n\bigl(D_m(x,\alpha),\alpha^m\bigr) \, .$$

The E_{n} also satisfy a functional equation

$$E_n\left(y + \frac{\alpha}{y}, \alpha\right) = \frac{y^{n+1} - \left(\frac{\alpha}{y}\right)^{n+1}}{y - \frac{\alpha}{y}} \,,$$

for y ≠ 0, y^{2} ≠ α, with α ∈ F_{q} and y ∈ F_{q^{2}}.

The Dickson polynomial y = D_{n} is a solution of the ordinary differential equation

$$\left(x^2-4\alpha\right)y'' + xy' - n^2y=0 \,,$$

and the Dickson polynomial y = E_{n} is a solution of the differential equation

$$\left(x^2-4\alpha\right)y'' + 3xy' - n(n+2)y=0 \,.$$

Their ordinary generating functions are

$$\begin{align}
\sum_n D_n(x,\alpha)z^n &= \frac{2-xz}{1-xz+\alpha z^2} \\
\sum_n E_n(x,\alpha)z^n &= \frac{1}{1-xz+\alpha z^2} \,.
\end{align}$$

== Links to other polynomials ==
By the recurrence relation above, Dickson polynomials are Lucas sequences. Specifically, for α = −1, the Dickson polynomials of the first kind are Fibonacci polynomials, and Dickson polynomials of the second kind are Lucas polynomials.

By the composition rule above, when α is idempotent, composition of Dickson polynomials of the first kind is commutative.

- The Dickson polynomials with parameter α = 0 give monomials.

$D_n(x,0) = x^n \, .$

- The Dickson polynomials with parameter α = 1 are related to Chebyshev polynomials T_{n}(x) = cos (n arccos x) of the first kind by

$D_n(2x, 1) = 2T_n(x) \,.$

- Since the Dickson polynomial D_{n}(x,α) can be defined over rings with additional idempotents, D_{n}(x,α) is often not related to a Chebyshev polynomial.

== Permutation polynomials and Dickson polynomials ==
A permutation polynomial (for a given finite field) is one that acts as a permutation of the elements of the finite field.

The Dickson polynomial D_{n}(x, α) (considered as a function of x with α fixed) is a permutation polynomial for the field with q elements if and only if n is coprime to q^{2} − 1.

Fried (1970) proved that any integral polynomial that is a permutation polynomial for infinitely many prime fields is a composition of Dickson polynomials and linear polynomials (with rational coefficients). This assertion has become known as Schur's conjecture, although in fact Schur did not make this conjecture. Since Fried's paper contained numerous errors, a corrected account was given by Turnwald (1995), and subsequently Müller (1997) gave a simpler proof along the lines of an argument due to Schur.

Further, Müller (1997) proved that any permutation polynomial over the finite field F_{q} whose degree is simultaneously coprime to q and less than q^{1/4} must be a composition of Dickson polynomials and linear polynomials.

== Generalization ==
Dickson polynomials of both kinds over finite fields can be thought of as initial members of a sequence of generalized Dickson polynomials referred to as Dickson polynomials of the (k + 1)th kind. Specifically, for α ≠ 0 ∈ F_{q} with q = p^{e} for some prime p and any integers n ≥ 0 and 0 ≤ k < p, the nth Dickson polynomial of the (k + 1)th kind over F_{q}, denoted by D_{n,k}(x,α), is defined by

$$D_{0,k}(x,\alpha) = 2 - k$$

and

$$D_{n,k}(x,\alpha)=\sum_{i=0}^{\left\lfloor \frac{n}{2} \right\rfloor}\frac{n - ki}{n-i}\binom{n-i}{i} (-\alpha)^i x^{n-2i} \,.$$

D_{n,0}(x,α) = D_{n}(x,α) and D_{n,1}(x,α) = E_{n}(x,α), showing that this definition unifies and generalizes the original polynomials of Dickson.

The significant properties of the Dickson polynomials also generalize:

- Recurrence relation: For n ≥ 2,

$$D_{n,k}(x,\alpha) = xD_{n-1,k}(x,\alpha)-\alpha D_{n-2,k}(x,\alpha)\,,$$

with the initial conditions D_{0,k}(x,α) = 2 − k and D_{1,k}(x,α) = x.

- Functional equation:

$$D_{n,k}\left(y + \alpha y^{-1}, \alpha\right) = \frac{y^{2n} +k\alpha y^{2n-2} + \cdots +k\alpha^{n-1}y^2 + \alpha^n}{y^n} = \frac{y^{2n} + {\alpha}^n}{y^n} + \left(\frac{k\alpha}{y^n} \right) \frac{y^{2n} - {\alpha}^{n-1}y^2}{y^2 - \alpha} \,,$$

where y ≠ 0, y^{2} ≠ α.

- Generating function:

$$\sum_{n=0}^{\infty} D_{n,k}(x,\alpha)z^n = \frac{2 - k + (k-1)xz}{1 - xz + \alpha z^2} \,.$$
