= Maximal arc =

A maximal arc in a finite projective plane is a largest possible (k,d)-arc in that projective plane. If the finite projective plane has order q (there are q+1 points on any line), then for a maximal arc, k, the number of points of the arc, is the maximum possible (= qd + d − q) with the property that no d+1 points of the arc lie on the same line.

== Definition ==
Let $\pi$ be a finite projective plane of order q (not necessarily desarguesian). Maximal arcs of degree d (2 ≤ d ≤ q − 1) are (k,d)-arcs in $\pi$, where k is maximal with respect to the parameter d, in other words, k = qd + d − q.

Equivalently, one can define maximal arcs of degree d in $\pi$ as non-empty sets of points K such that every line intersects the set either in 0 or d points.

Some authors permit the degree of a maximal arc to be 1, q or even q + 1. Letting K be a maximal (k, d)-arc in a projective plane of order q, if

- d = 1, K is a point of the plane,
- d = q, K is the complement of a line (an affine plane of order q), and
- d = q + 1, K is the entire projective plane.

All of these cases are considered to be trivial examples of maximal arcs, existing in any type of projective plane for any value of q. When 2 ≤ d ≤ q − 1, the maximal arc is called non-trivial, and the definition given above and the properties listed below all refer to non-trivial maximal arcs.

== Properties ==
- The number of lines through a fixed point p, not on a maximal arc K, intersecting K in d points, equals $(q+1)-\frac{q}{d}$. Thus, d divides q.
- In the special case of d = 2, maximal arcs are known as hyperovals which can only exist if q is even.
- An arc K having one fewer point than a maximal arc can always be uniquely extended to a maximal arc by adding to K the point at which all the lines meeting K in d − 1 points meet.
- In PG(2,q) with q odd, no non-trivial maximal arcs exist.
- In PG(2,2^{h}), maximal arcs for every degree 2^{t}, 1 ≤ t ≤ h exist.

== Partial geometries ==
One can construct partial geometries, derived from maximal arcs:

- Let K be a maximal arc with degree d. Consider the incidence structure $S(K)=(P,B,I)$, where P contains all points of the projective plane not on K, B contains all line of the projective plane intersecting K in d points, and the incidence I is the natural inclusion. This is a partial geometry : $pg(q-d,q-\frac{q}{d},q-\frac{q}{d}-d+1)$.
- Consider the space $PG(3,2^h) (h\geq 1)$ and let K a maximal arc of degree $d=2^s (1\leq s\leq m)$ in a two-dimensional subspace $\pi$. Consider an incidence structure $T_2^{*}(K)=(P,B,I)$ where P contains all the points not in $\pi$, B contains all lines not in $\pi$ and intersecting $\pi$ in a point in K, and I is again the natural inclusion. $T_2^{*}(K)$ is again a partial geometry : $pg(2^h-1,(2^h+1)(2^m-1),2^m-1)\,$.
