= Ernst Jacobsthal =

German mathematician (1882–1965)

Ernst Erich Jacobsthal (16 October 1882, Berlin – 6 February 1965, Überlingen) was a German mathematician, and brother to the archaeologist Paul Jacobsthal.

In 1906, he earned his PhD at the University of Berlin, where he was a student of Georg Frobenius, Hermann Schwarz and Issai Schur; his dissertation, Anwendung einer Formel aus der Theorie der quadratischen Reste (Application of a Formula from the Theory of Quadratic Residues), provided a proof that prime numbers of the form 4n + 1 are the sum of two square numbers. In 1934, he was fired from his professorship at the Technische Hochschule Berlin, because of his Jewish origins. In 1939 he fled to Norway and became after the war a professor at the Norwegian Institute of Technology in Trondheim.

== See also ==
- Jacobsthal sum
- Jacobsthal number
- Fermat's theorem on sums of two squares
