= Jacobsthal number =

Numbers in a type of Lucas sequence

In mathematics, the Jacobsthal numbers are an integer sequence named after the German mathematician Ernst Jacobsthal. Like the related Fibonacci numbers, they are a specific type of Lucas sequence $U_n(P,Q)$ for which P = 1, and Q = −2—and are defined by a similar recurrence relation: in simple terms, the sequence starts with 0 and 1, then each following number is found by adding the number before it to twice the number before that. The first Jacobsthal numbers are:

0, 1, 1, 3, 5, 11, 21, 43, 85, 171, 341, 683, 1365, 2731, 5461, 10923, 21845, 43691, 87381, 174763, 349525, … (sequence A001045 in the OEIS)

A Jacobsthal prime is a Jacobsthal number that is also prime. The first Jacobsthal primes are:

3, 5, 11, 43, 683, 2731, 43691, 174763, 2796203, 715827883, 2932031007403, 768614336404564651, 201487636602438195784363, 845100400152152934331135470251, 56713727820156410577229101238628035243, … (sequence A049883 in the OEIS)

== Jacobsthal numbers ==
Jacobsthal numbers are defined by the recurrence relation:

$$J_n = \begin{cases}
0                  & \mbox{if } n = 0; \\
1                  & \mbox{if } n = 1; \\
J_{n-1} + 2J_{n-2} & \mbox{if } n > 1. \\
\end{cases}$$

The next Jacobsthal number is also given by the recursion formula

$$J_{n+1} = 2J_n + (-1)^n,$$

or by

$$J_{n+1} = 2^n - J_n.$$

The second recursion formula above is also satisfied by the powers of 2.

The Jacobsthal number at a specific point in the sequence may be calculated directly using the closed-form equation:

$$J_n = \frac{2^n - (-1)^n}{3}.$$

The generating function for the Jacobsthal numbers is

$$\frac{x}{(1+x)(1-2x)}.$$

The sum of the reciprocals of the Jacobsthal numbers is approximately 2.7186, slightly larger than e.

The Jacobsthal numbers can be extended to negative indices using the recurrence relation or the explicit formula, giving

$J_{-n} = (-1)^{n+1} J_n / 2^n$ (see OEIS: A077925)

The following identities holds

$2^n(J_{-n} + J_n) = 3 J_n^2$ (see OEIS: A139818)

$J_n = F_n + \sum_{i=0}^{n-2}J_iF_{n-i-1}$ where $F_n$ is the nth Fibonacci number.

== Jacobsthal–Lucas numbers ==
Jacobsthal–Lucas numbers represent the complementary Lucas sequence $V_n(1,-2)$. They satisfy the same recurrence relation as Jacobsthal numbers but have different initial values:

$$j_n =
\begin{cases}
2                     & \mbox{if } n = 0; \\
1                     & \mbox{if } n = 1; \\
j_{n-1} + 2j_{n-2}    & \mbox{if } n > 1. \\
\end{cases}$$

The following Jacobsthal–Lucas number also satisfies:

$$j_{n+1} = 2j_n - 3(-1)^n. \,$$

The Jacobsthal–Lucas number at a specific point in the sequence may be calculated directly using the closed-form equation:

$$j_n = 2^n + (-1)^n. \,$$

The first Jacobsthal–Lucas numbers are:

2, 1, 5, 7, 17, 31, 65, 127, 257, 511, 1025, 2047, 4097, 8191, 16385, 32767, 65537, 131071, 262145, 524287, 1048577, … (sequence A014551 in the OEIS).

== Jacobsthal Oblong numbers ==
The first Jacobsthal Oblong numbers are: 0, 1, 3, 15, 55, 231, 903, 3655, 14535, 58311, … (sequence A084175 in the OEIS)

$$Jo_{n} = J_{n} J_{n+1}$$
