= Yangi-Yul =

Yangi-Yul Янги-Юл
- Village
- Location within Bashkortostan Location within Russia
- Coordinates: 52°10′N 56°33′E
- Country: Russia
- Region: Bashkortostan
- District: Zianchurinsky District
- Time zone: UTC+5:00

Yangi-Yul (Russian: Янги-Юл; Bashkir: Яңы Юл, Yañı Yul) is a rural locality (a village) in Isyangulovsky Selsoviet, Zianchurinsky District, Bashkortostan, Russia. The population was 196 as of 2010. There are 5 streets.

== Geography ==
Yangi-Yul is located 5 km southwest of Isyangulovo (the district's administrative centre) by road. Novopavlovka is the nearest rural locality.
