= Linearised polynomial =

In mathematics, a linearised polynomial (or q-polynomial) is a polynomial for which the exponents of all the constituent monomials are powers of q and the coefficients come from some extension field of the finite field of order q.

We write a typical example as $L(x) = \sum_{i=0}^n a_i x^{q^i},$ where each $a_i$ is in $F_{q^m} (= \operatorname{GF}(q^m))$ for some fixed positive integer $m$.

This special class of polynomials is important from both a theoretical and an applications viewpoint. The highly structured nature of their roots makes these roots easy to determine.

== Properties ==
- The map x ↦ L(x) is a linear map over any field containing F_{q}.
- The set of roots of L is an F_{q}-vector space and is closed under the q-Frobenius map.
- Conversely, if U is any F_{q}-linear subspace of some finite field containing F_{q}, then the polynomial that vanishes exactly on U is a linearised polynomial.
- The set of linearised polynomials over a given field is closed under addition and composition of polynomials.
- If L is a nonzero linearised polynomial over $F_{q^n}$ with all of its roots lying in the field $F_{q^s}$ an extension field of $F_{q^n}$, then each root of L has the same multiplicity, which is either 1, or a positive power of q.

== Symbolic multiplication ==
In general, the product of two linearised polynomials will not be a linearized polynomial, but since the composition of two linearised polynomials results in a linearised polynomial, composition may be used as a replacement for multiplication and, for this reason, composition is often called symbolic multiplication in this setting. Notationally, if L_{1}(x) and L_{2}(x) are linearised polynomials we define $L_1(x) \otimes L_2(x) = L_1(L_2(x))$ when this point of view is being taken.

== Associated polynomials ==
The polynomials L(x) and $l(x) = \sum_{i=0}^n a_i x^i$ are q-associates (note: the exponents "q^{i}" of L(x) have been replaced by "i" in l(x)). More specifically, l(x) is called the conventional q-associate of L(x), and L(x) is the linearised q-associate of l(x).

== q-polynomials over F_{q} ==
Linearised polynomials with coefficients in F_{q} have additional properties which make it possible to define symbolic division, symbolic reducibility and symbolic factorization. Two important examples of this type of linearised polynomial are the Frobenius automorphism $x \mapsto x^q$ and the trace function $\operatorname{Tr}(x) = \sum_{i=0}^{n-1} x^{q^i}.$

In this special case it can be shown that, as an operation, symbolic multiplication is commutative, associative and distributes over ordinary addition. Also, in this special case, we can define the operation of symbolic division. If L(x) and L_{1}(x) are linearised polynomials over F_{q}, we say that L_{1}(x) symbolically divides L(x) if there exists a linearised polynomial L_{2}(x) over F_{q} for which: $L(x) = L_1(x) \otimes L_2(x).$

If L_{1}(x) and L_{2}(x) are linearised polynomials over F_{q} with conventional q-associates l_{1}(x) and l_{2}(x) respectively, then L_{1}(x) symbolically divides L_{2}(x) if and only if l_{1}(x) divides l_{2}(x). Furthermore, L_{1}(x) divides L_{2}(x) in the ordinary sense in this case.

A linearised polynomial L(x) over F_{q} of degree > 1 is symbolically irreducible over F_{q} if the only symbolic decompositions $L(x) = L_1(x) \otimes L_2(x),$ with L_{i} over F_{q} are those for which one of the factors has degree 1. Note that a symbolically irreducible polynomial is always reducible in the ordinary sense since any linearised polynomial of degree > 1 has the nontrivial factor x. A linearised polynomial L(x) over F_{q} is symbolically irreducible if and only if its conventional q-associate l(x) is irreducible over F_{q}.

Every q-polynomial L(x) over F_{q} of degree > 1 has a symbolic factorization into symbolically irreducible polynomials over F_{q} and this factorization is essentially unique (up to rearranging factors and multiplying by nonzero elements of F_{q}.)

For example, consider the 2-polynomial L(x) = x^{16} + x^{8} + x^{2} + x over F_{2} and its conventional 2-associate l(x) = x^{4} + x^{3} + x + 1. The factorization into irreducibles of l(x) = (x^{2} + x + 1)(x + 1)^{2} in F_{2}[x], gives the symbolic factorization $L(x) = (x^4 + x^2 + x) \otimes (x^2 + x) \otimes (x^2 + x).$

== Affine polynomials ==
Let L be a linearised polynomial over $F_{q^n}$. A polynomial of the form $A(x) = L(x) - \alpha \text{ for } \alpha \in F_{q^n},$ is an affine polynomial over $F_{q^n}$.

Theorem: If A is a nonzero affine polynomial over $F_{q^n}$ with all of its roots lying in the field $F_{q^s}$ an extension field of $F_{q^n}$, then each root of A has the same multiplicity, which is either 1, or a positive power of q.
