= Rhyno Janse van Rensburg =

South African cricketer (born 1991)

Rhyno Janse van Rensburg (born 16 December 1991) is a South African former cricketer. He was a right-handed batsman and right-arm medium-pace bowler who played for Griqualand West (Northern Cape). He was born in Kimberley.

Van Rensburg made his cricketing debut for Griqualand West Under-19s in the CSA Under-19 competition during the 2008–09 season, taking the wicket of Nashen Govender early in the match, and scoring a half century.

He made his first-class debut for the side during the 2009–10 season, against Boland.
