= Jacobsthal sum =

In mathematics, Jacobsthal sums are finite sums of Legendre symbols related to Gauss sums. They were introduced by Jacobsthal (1907).

== Definition ==
The Jacobsthal sum is given by

$$\phi_n(a)=\sum_{m\bmod p}\left(\dfrac{m(m^n+a)}{p}\right)$$

where p is a prime and () is the Legendre symbol.
