= William G. L. Janse van Rensburg =

South African mayor

William Groenewald Louwrens Janse van Rensburg (April 10, 1939 – August 9, 2008), was the mayor of the city of Johannesburg, South Africa, from 1990 to 1991.
