= Projective cone =

A projective cone (or just cone) in projective geometry is the union of all lines that intersect a projective subspace R (the apex of the cone) and an arbitrary subset A (the basis) of some other subspace S, disjoint from R.

In the special case that R is a single point, S is a plane, and A is a conic section on S, the projective cone is a conical surface; hence the name.

== Definition ==
Let X be a projective space over some field K, and R, S be disjoint subspaces of X. Let A be an arbitrary subset of S. Then we define RA, the cone with top R and basis A, as follows :

- When A is empty, RA = A.
- When A is not empty, RA consists of all those points on a line connecting a point on R and a point on A.

== Properties ==
- As R and S are disjoint, one may deduce from linear algebra and the definition of a projective space that every point on RA not in R or A is on exactly one line connecting a point in R and a point in A.
- (RA) $\cap$ S = A
- When K is the finite field of order q, then $|R A|$ = $q^{r+1}$$|A|$ + $\frac{q^{r+1}-1}{q-1}$, where r = dim(R).

== See also ==
- Cone (geometry)
- Cone (algebraic geometry)
- Cone (topology)
- Cone (linear algebra)
- Conic section
- Ruled surface
- Hyperboloid
