= Principal axis =

Principal axis may refer to:

- Principal axis (crystallography)
- Principal axis (mechanics)
- Principal axis theorem

== See also ==
- Aircraft principal axes
- One of the two principal axes of a hyperbola
- Optical axis
- The highest-order symmetry axis of a molecule, based on its molecular symmetry
