= Spherical conic =

Curve on the sphere analogous to an ellipse or hyperbola

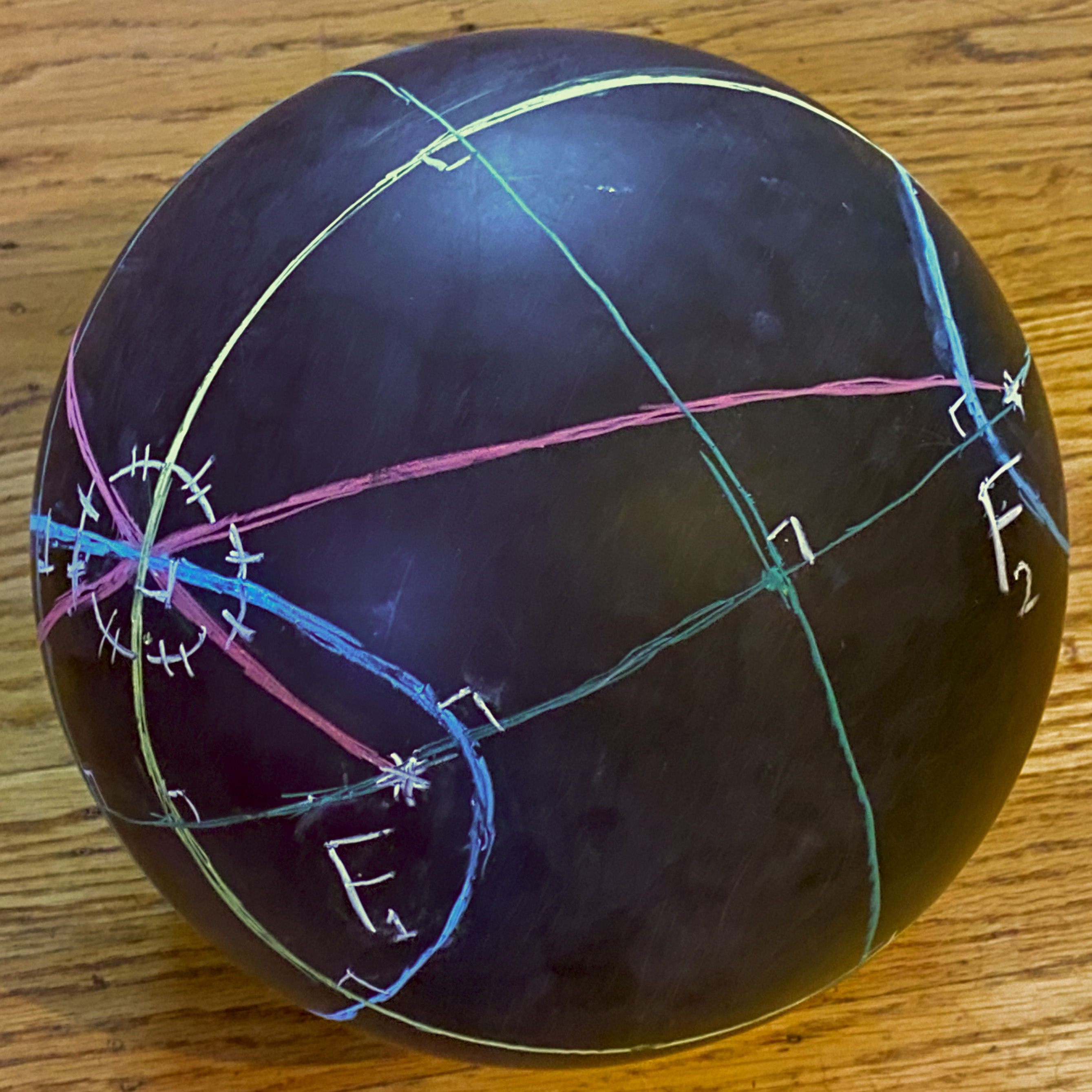
Spherical conics drawn on a spherical chalkboard. Two confocal conics in blue and yellow share foci F_{1} and F_{2}. Angles formed with red great-circle arcs from the foci through one of the conics' intersections demonstrate the reflection property of spherical conics. Three mutually perpendicular conic centers and three lines of symmetry in green define a spherical octahedron aligned with the principal axes of the conic.

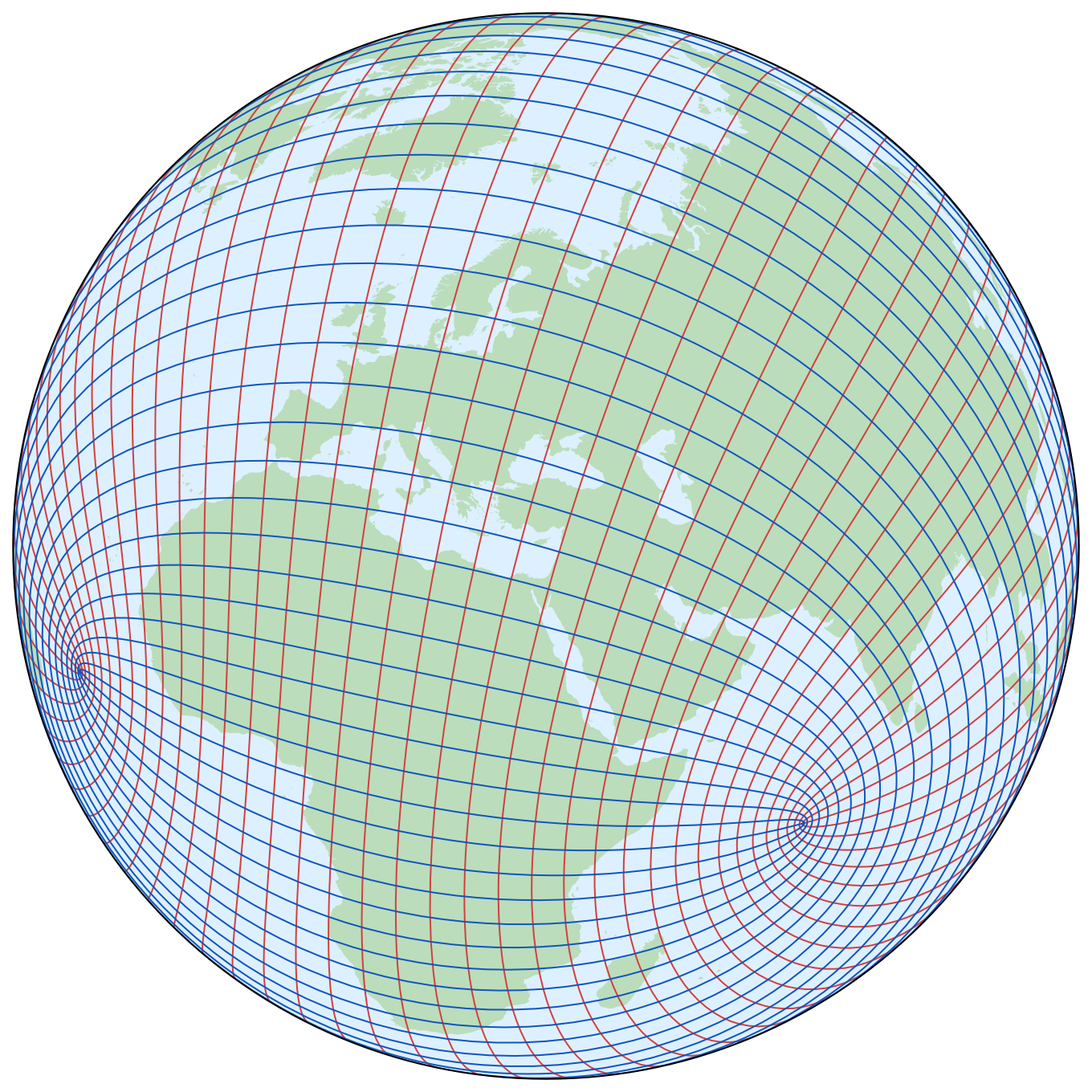
A grid on the square dihedron under inverse Peirce quincuncial projection is conformal except at four singularities around the equator, which become the foci of a grid of spherical conics.

In mathematics, a spherical conic or sphero-conic is a curve on the sphere, the intersection of the sphere with a concentric elliptic cone. It is the spherical analog of a conic section (ellipse, parabola, or hyperbola) in the plane, and as in the planar case, a spherical conic can be defined as the locus of points the sum or difference of whose great-circle distances to two foci is constant. By taking the antipodal point to one focus, every spherical ellipse is also a spherical hyperbola, and vice versa. As a space curve, a spherical conic is a quartic, though its orthogonal projections in three principal axes are planar conics. Like planar conics, spherical conics also satisfy a "reflection property": the great-circle arcs from the two foci to any point on the conic have the tangent and normal to the conic at that point as their angle bisectors.

Many theorems about conics in the plane extend to spherical conics. For example, Graves's theorem and Ivory's theorem about confocal conics can also be proven on the sphere; see confocal conic sections about the planar versions.

Just as the arc length of an ellipse is given by an incomplete elliptic integral of the second kind, the arc length of a spherical conic is given by an incomplete elliptic integral of the third kind.

An orthogonal coordinate system in Euclidean space based on concentric spheres and quadratic cones is called a conical or sphero-conical coordinate system. When restricted to the surface of a sphere, the remaining coordinates are confocal spherical conics. Sometimes this is called an elliptic coordinate system on the sphere, by analogy to a planar elliptic coordinate system. Such coordinates can be used in the computation of conformal maps from the sphere to the plane.

== Applications ==
The solution of the Kepler problem in a space of uniform positive curvature is a spherical conic, with a potential proportional to the cotangent of geodesic distance.

Because it preserves distances to a pair of specified points, the two-point equidistant projection maps the family of confocal conics on the sphere onto two families of confocal ellipses and hyperbolae in the plane.

If a portion of the Earth is modeled as spherical, e.g. using the osculating sphere at a point on an ellipsoid of revolution, the hyperbolae used in hyperbolic navigation (which determines position based on the difference in received signal timing from fixed radio transmitters) are spherical conics.
