= Conical coordinates =

Three-dimensional orthogonal coordinate system

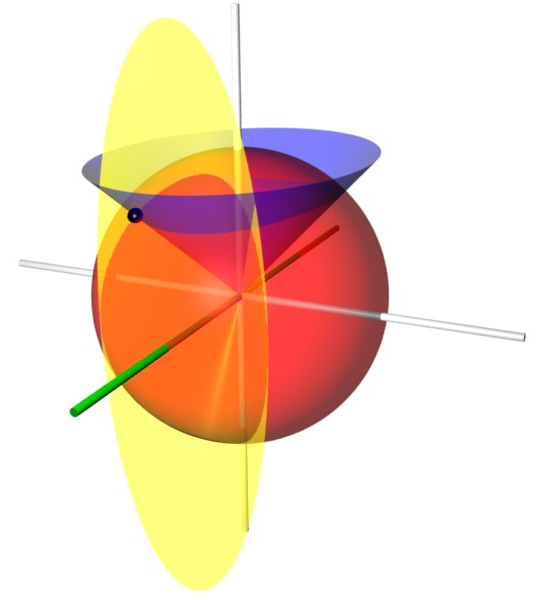
Coordinate surfaces of the conical coordinates. The constants b and c were chosen as 1 and 2, respectively. The red sphere represents r = 2, the blue elliptic cone aligned with the vertical z-axis represents μ=cosh(1) and the yellow elliptic cone aligned with the (green) x-axis corresponds to ν^{2} = 2/3. The three surfaces intersect at the point P (shown as a black sphere) with Cartesian coordinates roughly (1.26, −0.78, 1.34). The elliptic cones intersect the sphere in spherical conics.

Conical coordinates, sometimes called sphero-conal or sphero-conical coordinates, are a three-dimensional orthogonal coordinate system consisting of concentric spheres (described by their radius r) and by two families of perpendicular elliptic cones, aligned along the z- and x-axes, respectively. The intersection between one of the cones and the sphere forms a spherical conic.

== Basic definitions ==
The conical coordinates $(r, \mu, \nu)$ are defined by

$$x = \frac{r\mu\nu}{bc}$$

$$y = \frac{r}{b} \sqrt{\frac{\left( \mu^{2} - b^{2} \right) \left( \nu^{2} - b^{2} \right)}{\left( b^{2} - c^{2} \right)} }$$

$$z = \frac{r}{c} \sqrt{\frac{\left( \mu^{2} - c^{2} \right) \left( \nu^{2} - c^{2} \right)}{\left( c^{2} - b^{2} \right)} }$$

with the following limitations on the coordinates

$$\nu^{2} < c^{2} < \mu^{2} < b^{2}.$$

Surfaces of constant r are spheres of that radius centered on the origin

$$x^{2} + y^{2} + z^{2} = r^{2},$$

whereas surfaces of constant $\mu$ and $\nu$ are mutually perpendicular cones

$$\frac{x^{2}}{\mu^{2}} + \frac{y^{2}}{\mu^{2} - b^{2}} + \frac{z^{2}}{\mu^{2} - c^{2}} = 0$$

and

$$\frac{x^{2}}{\nu^{2}} + \frac{y^{2}}{\nu^{2} - b^{2}} + \frac{z^{2}}{\nu^{2} - c^{2}} = 0.$$

In this coordinate system, both Laplace's equation and the Helmholtz equation are separable.

== Scale factors ==
The scale factor for the radius r is one (h_{r} = 1), as in spherical coordinates. The scale factors for the two conical coordinates are

$$h_{\mu} = r \sqrt{\frac{\mu^{2} - \nu^{2}}{\left( b^{2} - \mu^{2} \right) \left( \mu^{2} - c^{2} \right)}}$$

and

$$h_{\nu} = r \sqrt{\frac{\mu^{2} - \nu^{2}}{\left( b^{2} - \nu^{2} \right) \left( c^{2} - \nu^{2} \right)}}.$$

== Bibliography ==
- Morse PM, Feshbach H (1953). Methods of Theoretical Physics, Part I. New York: McGraw-Hill. p. 659. ISBN 0-07-043316-X. LCCN 52011515.
- Margenau H, Murphy GM (1956). The Mathematics of Physics and Chemistry. New York: D. van Nostrand. pp. 183–184. LCCN 55010911.
- Korn GA, Korn TM (1961). Mathematical Handbook for Scientists and Engineers. New York: McGraw-Hill. p. 179. LCCN 59014456. ASIN B0000CKZX7.
- Sauer R, Szabó I (1967). Mathematische Hilfsmittel des Ingenieurs. New York: Springer Verlag. pp. 991–100. LCCN 67025285.
- Arfken G (1970). Mathematical Methods for Physicists (2nd ed.). Orlando, FL: Academic Press. pp. 118–119. ASIN B000MBRNX4.
- Moon P, Spencer DE (1988). "Conical Coordinates (r, θ, λ)". Field Theory Handbook, Including Coordinate Systems, Differential Equations, and Their Solutions (corrected 2nd ed., 3rd print ed.). New York: Springer-Verlag. pp. 37–40 (Table 1.09). ISBN 978-0-387-18430-2.
