= Elliptic cone =

Cone with an elliptical base

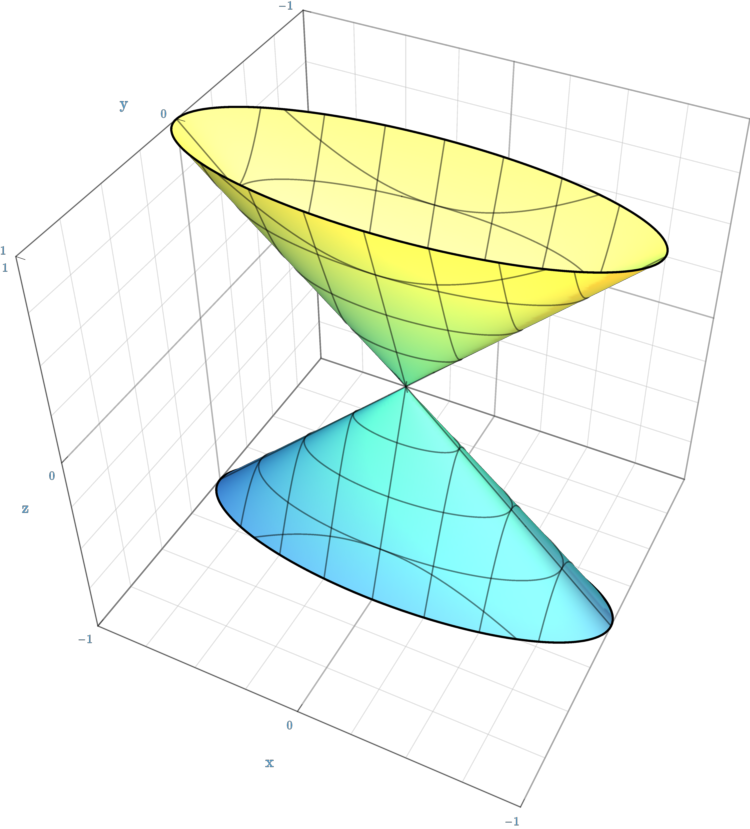
An elliptical cone quadric surface

An elliptical cone is a cone with an elliptical base. It is a generalization of the circular cone and a special case of the generalized cone.

The term might refer to the solid figure bounded by the base or only to the lateral conic surface, a quadric called conical quadric or quadratic cone.

In a three-dimensional Cartesian coordinate system, an elliptic cone is the locus of an equation of the form:

$$\frac{x^2}{a^2} + \frac{y^2}{b^2} = z^2 .$$

It is an affine image of the unit right circular cone with equation $x^2+y^2=z^2\ .$ From the fact that the affine image of a conic section is a conic section of the same type (ellipse, parabola, etc.), any plane section of an elliptic cone is a conic section (see Circular section#Elliptic cone).

The intersection curve of an elliptic cone with a concentric sphere is a spherical conic.
