= Quadric =

Locus of the zeros of a polynomial of degree two

In mathematics, a quadric or quadric surface is a generalization of conic sections (ellipses, parabolas, and hyperbolas). In three-dimensional space, quadrics include ellipsoids, paraboloids, and hyperboloids.

More generally, a quadric hypersurface (of dimension D) embedded in a higher dimensional space (of dimension D + 1) is defined as the zero set of an irreducible polynomial of degree two in D + 1 variables; for example, D=1 is the case of conic sections (plane curves). When the defining polynomial is not absolutely irreducible, the zero set is generally not considered a quadric, although it is often called a degenerate quadric or a reducible quadric.

A quadric is an affine algebraic variety, or, if it is reducible, an affine algebraic set. Quadrics may also be defined in projective spaces; see § Normal form of projective quadrics, below.

== Formulation ==
In coordinates x_{1}, x_{2}, ..., x_{D+1}, the general quadric is thus defined by the algebraic equation

$$\sum_{i,j=1}^{D+1} x_i Q_{ij} x_j + \sum_{i=1}^{D+1} P_i  x_i + R = 0$$

which may be compactly written in vector and matrix notation as:

$$x Q x^\mathrm{T} + P x^\mathrm{T} + R = 0\,$$

where x = (x_{1}, x_{2}, ..., x_{D+1}) is a row vector, x^{T} is the transpose of x (a column vector), Q is a (D + 1) × (D + 1) matrix and P is a (D + 1)-dimensional row vector and R a scalar constant. The values Q, P and R are often taken to be over real numbers or complex numbers, but a quadric may be defined over any field.

== Euclidean plane ==
Quadrics in a Euclidean plane have dimension one and are thus plane curves. They are called conic sections, or conics.

Ellipse (e = 0.5), parabola (e = 1), and hyperbola (e = 2) with fixed focus F and directrix.

== Euclidean space ==
In three-dimensional Euclidean space, quadrics have dimension two, and are known as quadric surfaces. Their quadratic equations have the form
$$m_{xx} x^2 + m_{yy} y^2 + m_{zz} z^2 + 2m_{xy} xy + 2m_{xz} xz + 2m_{yz} yz + 2m_x x + 2m_y y + 2m_z z + m_0= 0$$
or
$${\bold p^\bold T \bold M \bold p} = 0$$
where
$${\bold M} = \begin{bmatrix} m_{xx} & m_{xy} & m_{xz} & m_{x}
\\ m_{xy} & m_{yy} & m_{yz} & m_{y}
\\ m_{xz} & m_{yz} & m_{zz} & m_{z}
\\ m_{x} & m_{y} & m_{z} & m_{0} \end{bmatrix}$$
and
$${\bold p} =  \begin{bmatrix} x \\ y \\ z\\ 1 \end{bmatrix}$$

The quadric surfaces are classified and named by their shape, which corresponds to the orbits under affine transformations. That is, if an affine transformation maps a quadric onto another one, they belong to the same class, and share the same name and many properties.

The principal axis theorem shows that for any (possibly reducible) quadric, a suitable change of Cartesian coordinates or, equivalently, a Euclidean transformation allows putting the equation of the quadric into a unique simple form on which the class of the quadric is immediately visible. This form is called the normal form of the equation, since two quadrics have the same normal form if and only if there is a Euclidean transformation that maps one quadric to the other. The normal forms are as follows:

$${x^2 \over a^2} + {y^2 \over b^2} +\varepsilon_1  {z^2 \over c^2} + \varepsilon_2=0,$$
$${x^2 \over a^2} - {y^2 \over b^2}  + \varepsilon_3=0$$
$${x^2 \over a^2}  + \varepsilon_4 =0,$$
$$z={x^2 \over a^2} +\varepsilon_5 {y^2 \over b^2},$$

where the $\varepsilon_i$ are either 1, −1 or 0, except $\varepsilon_3$ which takes only the value 0 or 1.

Each of these 17 normal forms corresponds to a single orbit under affine transformations. In three cases there are no real points: $\varepsilon_1=\varepsilon_2=1$ (imaginary ellipsoid), $\varepsilon_1=0, \varepsilon_2=1$ (imaginary elliptic cylinder), and $\varepsilon_4=1$ (pair of complex conjugate parallel planes, a reducible quadric). In one case, the imaginary cone, there is a single point ($\varepsilon_1=1, \varepsilon_2=0$). If $\varepsilon_1=\varepsilon_2=0,$ one has a line (in fact two complex conjugate intersecting planes). For $\varepsilon_3=0,$ one has two intersecting planes (reducible quadric). For $\varepsilon_4=0,$ one has a double plane. For $\varepsilon_4=-1,$ one has two parallel planes (reducible quadric).

Thus, among the 17 normal forms, there are nine true quadrics: a cone, three cylinders (often called degenerate quadrics) and five non-degenerate quadrics (ellipsoid, paraboloids and hyperboloids), which are detailed in the following tables. The eight remaining quadrics are the imaginary ellipsoid (no real point), the imaginary cylinder (no real point), the imaginary cone (a single real point), and the reducible quadrics, which are decomposed in two planes; there are five such decomposed quadrics, depending whether the planes are distinct or not, parallel or not, real or complex conjugate.

Non-degenerate real quadric surfaces
Ellipsoid	${x^2 \over a^2} + {y^2 \over b^2} + {z^2 \over c^2} = 1 \,$
Elliptic paraboloid	${x^2 \over a^2} + {y^2 \over b^2} - z = 0 \,$
Hyperbolic paraboloid	${x^2 \over a^2} - {y^2 \over b^2} - z = 0 \,$
Hyperboloid of one sheet or Hyperbolic hyperboloid	${x^2 \over a^2} + {y^2 \over b^2} - {z^2 \over c^2} = 1 \,$
Hyperboloid of two sheets or Elliptic hyperboloid	${x^2 \over a^2} + {y^2 \over b^2} - {z^2 \over c^2} = - 1 \,$

Degenerate real quadric surfaces
Elliptic cone or Conical quadric	${x^2 \over a^2} + {y^2 \over b^2} - {z^2 \over c^2} = 0 \,$
Elliptic cylinder	${x^2 \over a^2} + {y^2 \over b^2} = 1 \,$
Hyperbolic cylinder	${x^2 \over a^2} - {y^2 \over b^2} = 1 \,$
Parabolic cylinder	$x^2 + 2ay = 0 \,$

When two or more of the parameters of the canonical equation are equal, one obtains a quadric of revolution, which remains invariant when rotated around an axis (or infinitely many axes, in the case of the sphere).

Quadrics of revolution
Oblate and prolate spheroids (special cases of ellipsoid)	${x^2 \over a^2} + {y^2 \over a^2} + {z^2 \over b^2} = 1 \,$
Sphere (special case of spheroid)	${x^2 \over a^2} + {y^2 \over a^2} + {z^2 \over a^2} = 1 \,$
Circular paraboloid (special case of elliptic paraboloid)	${x^2 \over a^2} + {y^2 \over a^2} - z = 0 \,$
Hyperboloid of revolution of one sheet (special case of hyperboloid of one sheet)	${x^2 \over a^2} + {y^2 \over a^2} - {z^2 \over b^2} = 1 \,$
Hyperboloid of revolution of two sheets (special case of hyperboloid of two sheets)	${x^2 \over a^2} + {y^2 \over a^2} - {z^2 \over b^2} = -1 \,$
Circular cone (special case of elliptic cone)	${x^2 \over a^2} + {y^2 \over a^2} - {z^2 \over b^2} = 0 \,$
Circular cylinder (special case of elliptic cylinder)	${x^2 \over a^2} + {y^2 \over a^2} = 1 \,$

=== Intersection of a Ray with a Quadric Surface ===
One can represent a three-dimensional ray parametrically as
$$\begin{array}{lcl} x & = & x_0 + \alpha t
\\ y & = & y_0 + \beta t
\\ z & = & z_0 + \gamma t
\end{array}$$
where $\alpha$, $\beta$, and $\gamma$ are the $x$, $y$, and $z$ components of the normalized direction vector of the ray and $t$ is the distance along the ray. Inserting these values into the equation for a three-dimensional quadric surface, one obtains a quadratic equation for $t$. If there are two real roots, this gives the two intersection points of the ray with the quadric surface. If there is a double root, then the ray grazes the surface. If there are no real roots, then the ray misses the quadric surface.

Alternatively, using homogeneous coordinates, one may represent the ray as
$${\bold r} = {\bold {p_0}} + {\bold d}t$$
where
$${\bold {p_0}} = \begin{bmatrix} x_0 \\ y_0 \\ z_0 \\ 1 \end{bmatrix}$$
is a line through the point $(x_0, y_0, z_0)$ and
$${\bold d} = \begin{bmatrix} \alpha \\ \beta \\ \gamma \\ 0 \end{bmatrix}$$
is the direction vector of the ray. The equation for the intersection of a ray with a quadric surface is then represented as
$$\begin{alignat}{2} 0 & = {\bold r}^T {\bold {M r}}
\\ & = {({\bold p_0} + t{\bold d})}^T {\bold M} ({\bold {p_0}} + t {\bold d})
\\ & = ({\bold d}^t {\bold {M d}}) t^2 + (2 {\bold d}^T {\bold {M p_0}}) t + ({\bold p_0}^T {\bold {M p_0}})
\end{alignat}$$
yielding the same quadratic equation in t.

The normal to any point on the surface is
$${\bold n} = norm({\bold {M p}}).$$

=== Quadric surface patches in graphical ray tracing ===
In computer graphics, the visual representation of mathematically modeled objects is frequently determined by ray tracing. Frequently, the surfaces of the objects are described in terms of a number of points on the surface and the normals to the surface at those points. The intermediate points on the surface are described by a set of surface patches between the points. Quadric surfaces are frequently used this way when the surface is described as a set of triangles using the positions and normals to the points of those triangles. Using quadric surfaces to model these patches has the advantage that it is easy to tell if and where a light ray intersects a patch, as was described in the previous section.

The equation for a quadric surface has ten variables, but only nine independent variables, since the multiplication of the equation by any non-zero constant has no effect. The normals and locations of three points gives nine constraints. Thus it would seem that it is possible to uniquely determine a quadric surface triangular patch from this information. Indeed, one can construct a $9 \times 9$ linear matrix to designate these constraints. However, it can be shown that this matrix will always be singular, so some additional constraint must be added to uniquely determine the quadric surface of that patch.

=== Determining the quadric surface type and the displacement from standard position ===
In general, quadric equations may not be in normal form, and it may be difficult to determine the type of quadric surface by visual inspection unless the quadric surface has its center at the origin and the principal axes are along the x, y, and z directions. However, if one defines the submatrix of ${\bold M}$
$${\bold A} = \begin{bmatrix} m_{xx} & m_{xy} & m_{xz}
\\ m_{xy} & m_{yy} & m_{yz}
\\ m_{xz} & m_{yz} & m_{zz}
\end{bmatrix}$$
then the following table allows classification of the quadric surface, based on the ranks, determinants, and eigenvalues of the ${\bold A}$ and ${\bold M}$ matrices.

Rank of ${\bold A}$	Rank of ${\bold M}$	Sign of determinant of ${\bold M}$	Non-zero eigenvalues of ${\bold M}$ of the same sign?	Are all eigenvalues of ${\bold A}$ of the same sign?	Type of quadric surface
3	4	Negative	No	Yes	Real ellipsoid
3	4	Positive	Yes	Yes	Imaginary ellipsoid
3	4	Positive	No	No	Hyperboloid of one sheet
3	4	Negative	No	No	Hyperboloid of two sheets
3	3	-	No	No	Real quadric cone
3	3	-	Yes	Yes	Imaginary quadric cone
2	4	Negative	No	Yes	Elliptic paraboloid
2	4	Positive	No	No	Hyperbolic paraboloid
2	3	-	No	Yes	Real elliptic cylinder
2	3	-	Yes	No	Imaginary elliptic cylinder
2	2	-	No	No	Real intersecting planes
2	2	-	Yes	Yes	Imaginary intersecting planes
1	3	-	No	-	Parabolic cylinder
1	2	-	No	-	Parabolic cylinder
1	2	-	Yes	-	Imaginary parallel planes
1	1	-	-	-	Coincident planes

All real quadric surfaces except ellipsoids and hyperboloids are special limiting cases. Any real ellipsoid or hyperbolic and be expressed as a repositioned matrix of the form
$${\bold M} = {\bold P}^T {\bold M} \acute{} {\bold P} = 0$$
with ${\bold M} \acute{}$ containg only the diagonal components of $m_{xx} \acute{} , m_{yy} \acute{} , m_{zz} \acute{}$, and $m_0 \acute{}$, the others being zeroes. Here the x, y, and z axis columns of the affine matrix ${\bold P}$ are the normalized eigenvectors of ${\bold A}$. where the acute accent implies the matrix transpose. The location of the centroid, ${\bold p}$ (in the fourth column of ${\bold P}$) is
$${\bold p} = {\bold A}^{-1} \begin{bmatrix} q_x \\ q_y \\ q_z \end{bmatrix}$$
The axis radii have the values
$${radius}^2 = \frac {C}{eigenvalue \; of {\bold A}}$$
where the radial axes and along the eigenvectors of the corresponding eigenvalues, and
$$C = {\bold p}^T {\bold {A p}} - m_0$$
For a real ellipsoid, radii for all of the eigenvalues are positive. For a hyperboloid of one sheet, one of the squared radii is negative, the other two being those of the ellipse at the neck of the hyperboloid. For a hyperboloid of two sheets, two of the squared radii are negative and the real radius is the distance from the center point to the points of the sheets. If all three eigenvalues give negative squared radii, then the quadric surface is an imaginary ellipsoid.

=== Quadric Surface Affine Transformation ===
Affine transformation matrices are used to represent coordinate transformations. Such a matrix has the form
$${\bold {P_{1 0}}} = \begin {bmatrix} x_x & x_y & x_z & x_0
\\ y_x & y_y & y_z & y_0
\\ z_x & z_y & z_z & z_0
\\ 0 & 0 & 0 & 1
\end {bmatrix}$$
Here the first column of the matrix is the normalized direction vector of the $x$-axis of the new coordinate system $C_1$, with respect to the original coordinate system, $C_0$. The second column represents the $y$-axis, the third column the $z$-axis, and the fourth column is the location of the origin in $C_1$in the original coortinate system. A point at the location ${\bold {p_1}}$, in terms of the $C_1$coordinate system is at the point
$${\bold {p_0}} = \bold {P_{1 0} p_1}$$
in the original coordinate system. Note that here, the ${\bold {p_1}}$ vector has a "1" as its fourth term, since it is a location vector, while direction vectors have "0" for the fourth term. Using the usual rules for matrix algebra, the inverse transformation is obtained as the inverse of the matrix ${\bold {P_{1 0}}}$, that is,
$${\bold {P_{0 1}}} = {\bold {P_{1 0}}}^{-1}$$
These transformations can be concatenated, so that if there is a coordinate system $C_2$, with a location and orientation ${\bold {P_{2 1}}}$ with respect to $C_1$, its orientation with respect to $C_0$ is
$${\bold {P_{2 0}}} = {\bold {P_{2 1} P_{1 0}}}$$
as calculated using matrix multiplication. These transformation matrices are frequently used to calculate the locations and orientation of vehicles. For example, an aircraft at a point ${\bold {p_1}}$ in the aircraft frame of reference with be at a point ${\bold {p_0}}$ in the ground coordinate system, if ${\bold {P_{1 0}}}$ is the transformation between the ground frame of reference and the aircraft frame of reference.

Quadric surfaces have the nice property that they also transform under affine coordinate transformations. If a quadric surface, ${\bold M}$, is moved to a coordinate location and orientation $C_1$, its description as seen from the original coordinate system $C_1$ is
$${\bold M}_{moved \; to} = {\bold {P_{0 1}}}^T {\bold M} \; {\bold {P_{0 1}}}$$
However, this needs to be distinguished from a quadric surface defined in coordinate system $C_0$ as viewed from a coordinate system $C_1$, where the transformation is

${\bold M}_{viewed \; from} = {\bold {P_{1 0}}}^T {\bold M} \; {\bold {P_{1 0}}}$

Note that since ${\bold M}^T = {\bold M}$, it does not matter whether or not this matrix is transposed, and one may see it either way in the literature.

=== Latitude, longitude, and altitude as quadric surfaces ===
Latitude and longitude are normally thought of as lines on the globe, but when you consider that one may cross a line of latitude or longitude at different altitudes, it becomes obvious that these lines are actually surfaces, in fact, quadric surfaces. If the Earth is approximated as a sphere, longitudes are planes slicing though the center of the Earth and through the poles, while latitudes are cones, with the point of the cone at the center of the Earth. Altitudes are spheres of different radii. This is the general model currently used for naval and aviation navigation.

When the Earth is better approximated as an ellipsoid, the longitudes are still the same planes as for the spherical Earth. Latitudes are still cones, but the points of the cones are no longer at the center of the Earth, except at the equator; the cone axis is still along the Earth's axis, but north or south of the Earth center. Altitudes are ellipsoids. In the World Geodetic System 1984 (WGS84), the equatorial radius of the Earth is ($G_a$) is given as 6,378,137.0 meters and the polar radius ($G_b$) as 6,356,752.3142 meters. The squared first eccentricity is then
$${G_e}^2 = \frac {{G_a}^2 - {G_b}^2} {{G_a}^2} = 0.00669437999014$$

Given latitude $\phi$ and longitude $\lambda$, Earth-centered (geocentric) coordinates can be determined as
$$\begin{array}{lcl} x & = & (R_N + H) \cos \phi \cos \lambda
\\ y & = & (R_N + H) \cos \phi \sin \lambda
\\ z & = & (\frac {R_N G_b} {G_a} + H) \sin \phi
\end{array}$$
where H is the height above the Earth ellipsoid and
$$R_N = G_a / \sqrt{1 - {G_e}^2 {\sin }^2 \phi}.$$

== Definition and basic properties ==
An affine quadric is the set of zeros of a polynomial of degree two. When not specified otherwise, the polynomial is supposed to have real coefficients, and the zeros are points in a Euclidean space. However, most properties remain true when the coefficients belong to any field and the points belong in an affine space. As usual in algebraic geometry, it is often useful to consider points over an algebraically closed field containing the polynomial coefficients, generally the complex numbers, when the coefficients are real.

Many properties becomes easier to state (and to prove) by extending the quadric to the projective space by projective completion, consisting of adding points at infinity. Technically, if

$$p(x_1, \ldots,x_n)$$

is a polynomial of degree two that defines an affine quadric, then its projective completion is defined by homogenizing p into

$$P(X_0, \ldots, X_n)=X_0^2\,p\left(\frac {X_1}{X_0}, \ldots,\frac {X_n}{X_0}\right)$$

(this is a polynomial, because the degree of p is two). The points of the projective completion are the points of the projective space whose projective coordinates are zeros of P.

So, a projective quadric is the set of zeros in a projective space of a homogeneous polynomial of degree two.

As the above process of homogenization can be reverted by setting X_{0} = 1:

$$p(x_1, \ldots, x_n)=P(1, x_1, \ldots, x_n)\,,$$

it is often useful to not distinguish an affine quadric from its projective completion, and to talk of the affine equation or the projective equation of a quadric. However, this is not a perfect equivalence; it is generally the case that $P(\mathbf{X}) = 0$ will include points with $X_0 = 0$, which are not also solutions of $p(\mathbf{x}) = 0$ because these points in projective space correspond to points "at infinity" in affine space.

=== Equation ===
A quadric in an affine space of dimension n is the set of zeros of a polynomial of degree 2. That is, it is the set of the points whose coordinates satisfy an equation

$$p(x_1,\ldots,x_n)=0,$$

where the polynomial p has the form

$$p(x_1,\ldots,x_n) = \sum_{i=1}^n \sum_{j=1}^n a_{i,j}x_i x_j + \sum_{i=1}^n (a_{i,0}+a_{0,i})x_i +  a_{0,0}\,,$$

for a matrix $A = (a_{i,j})$ with $i$ and $j$ running from 0 to $n$. When the characteristic of the field of the coefficients is not two, generally $a_{i,j} = a_{j,i}$ is assumed; equivalently $A = A^{\mathsf T}$. When the characteristic of the field of the coefficients is two, generally $a_{i,j} = 0$ is assumed when $j < i$; equivalently $A$ is upper triangular.

The equation may be shortened, as the matrix equation

$$\mathbf x^{\mathsf T}A\mathbf x=0\,,$$

with

$$\mathbf x = \begin {pmatrix}1&x_1&\cdots&x_n\end{pmatrix}^{\mathsf T}\,.$$

The equation of the projective completion is almost identical:

$$\mathbf X^{\mathsf T}A\mathbf X=0,$$

with

$$\mathbf X = \begin {pmatrix}X_0&X_1&\cdots&X_n\end{pmatrix}^{\mathsf T}.$$

These equations define a quadric as an algebraic hypersurface of dimension n − 1 and degree two in a space of dimension n.

A quadric is said to be non-degenerate if the matrix $A$ is invertible.

A non-degenerate quadric is non-singular in the sense that its projective completion has no singular point (a cylinder is non-singular in the affine space, but it is a degenerate quadric that has a singular point at infinity).

The singular points of a degenerate quadric are the points whose projective coordinates belong to the null space of the matrix A.

A quadric is reducible if and only if the rank of A is one (case of a double hyperplane) or two (case of two hyperplanes).

== Normal form of projective quadrics ==
In real projective space, by Sylvester's law of inertia, a non-singular quadratic form P(X) may be put into the normal form

$$P(X) = \pm X_0^2 \pm X_1^2 \pm\cdots\pm X_{D+1}^2$$

by means of a suitable projective transformation (normal forms for singular quadrics can have zeros as well as ±1 as coefficients). For two-dimensional surfaces (dimension D = 2) in three-dimensional space, there are exactly three non-degenerate cases:

$$P(X) = \begin{cases}
X_0^2+X_1^2+X_2^2+X_3^2\\
X_0^2+X_1^2+X_2^2-X_3^2\\
X_0^2+X_1^2-X_2^2-X_3^2
\end{cases}$$

The first case is the empty set.

The second case generates the ellipsoid, the elliptic paraboloid or the hyperboloid of two sheets, depending on whether the chosen plane at infinity cuts the quadric in the empty set, in a point, or in a nondegenerate conic respectively. These all have positive Gaussian curvature.

The third case generates the hyperbolic paraboloid or the hyperboloid of one sheet, depending on whether the plane at infinity cuts it in two lines, or in a nondegenerate conic respectively. These are doubly ruled surfaces of negative Gaussian curvature.

The degenerate form

$$X_0^2-X_1^2-X_2^2=0. \,$$

generates the elliptic cylinder, the parabolic cylinder, the hyperbolic cylinder, or the cone, depending on whether the plane at infinity cuts it in a point, a line, two lines, or a nondegenerate conic respectively. These are singly ruled surfaces of zero Gaussian curvature.

We see that projective transformations don't mix Gaussian curvatures of different sign. This is true for general surfaces.

In complex projective space all of the nondegenerate quadrics become indistinguishable from each other.

== Rational parametrization ==
Given a non-singular point A of a quadric, a line passing through A is either tangent to the quadric, or intersects the quadric in exactly one other point (as usual, a line contained in the quadric is considered as a tangent, since it is contained in the tangent hyperplane). This means that the lines passing through A and not tangent to the quadric are in one to one correspondence with the points of the quadric that do not belong to the tangent hyperplane at A. Expressing the points of the quadric in terms of the direction of the corresponding line provides parametric equations of the following forms.

In the case of conic sections (quadric curves), this parametrization establishes a bijection between a projective conic section and a projective line; this bijection is an isomorphism of algebraic curves. In higher dimensions, the parametrization defines a birational map, which is a bijection between dense open subsets of the quadric and a projective space of the same dimension (the topology that is considered is the usual one in the case of a real or complex quadric, or the Zariski topology in all cases). The points of the quadric that are not in the image of this bijection are the points of intersection of the quadric and its tangent hyperplane at A.

In the affine case, the parametrization is a rational parametrization of the form

$$x_i=\frac{f_i(t_1,\ldots, t_{n-1})}{f_0(t_1,\ldots, t_{n-1})}\quad\text{for }i=1, \ldots, n,$$

where $x_1, \ldots, x_n$ are the coordinates of a point of the quadric, $t_1,\ldots,t_{n-1}$ are parameters, and $f_0, f_1, \ldots, f_n$ are polynomials of degree at most two.

In the projective case, the parametrization has the form

$$X_i=F_i(T_1,\ldots, T_n)\quad\text{for }i=0, \ldots, n,$$

where $X_0, \ldots, X_n$ are the projective coordinates of a point of the quadric, $T_1,\ldots,T_n$ are parameters, and $F_0, \ldots, F_n$ are homogeneous polynomials of degree two.

One passes from one parametrization to the other by putting $x_i=X_i/X_0,$ and $t_i=T_i/T_n\,:$

$$F_i(T_1,\ldots, T_n)=T_n^2 \,f_i\!{\left(\frac{T_1}{T_n},\ldots,\frac{T_{n-1}}{T_n}\right)}.$$

For computing the parametrization and proving that the degrees are as asserted, one may proceed as follows in the affine case. One can proceed similarly in the projective case.

Let q be the quadratic polynomial that defines the quadric, and $\mathbf a=(a_1,\ldots a_n)$ be the coordinate vector of the given point of the quadric (so, $q(\mathbf a)=0).$ Let $\mathbf x=(x_1,\ldots x_n)$ be the coordinate vector of the point of the quadric to be parametrized, and $\mathbf t=(t_1,\ldots, t_{n-1},1)$ be a vector defining the direction used for the parametrization (directions whose last coordinate is zero are not taken into account here; this means that some points of the affine quadric are not parametrized; one says often that they are parametrized by points at infinity in the space of parameters) . The points of the intersection of the quadric and the line of direction $\mathbf t$ passing through $\mathbf a$ are the points $\mathbf x=\mathbf a +\lambda \mathbf t$ such that

$$q(\mathbf a +\lambda \mathbf t)=0$$

for some value of the scalar $\lambda.$ This is an equation of degree two in $\lambda,$ except for the values of $\mathbf t$ such that the line is tangent to the quadric (in this case, the degree is one if the line is not included in the quadric, or the equation becomes $0=0$ otherwise). The coefficients of $\lambda$ and $\lambda^2$ are respectively of degree at most one and two in $\mathbf t.$ As the constant coefficient is $q(\mathbf a)=0,$ the equation becomes linear by dividing by $\lambda,$ and its unique solution is the quotient of a polynomial of degree at most one by a polynomial of degree at most two. Substituting this solution into the expression of $\mathbf x,$ one obtains the desired parametrization as fractions of polynomials of degree at most two.

=== Example: circle and spheres ===
Let consider the quadric of equation

$$x_1^2+ x_2^2+\cdots x_n^2 -1=0.$$

For $n=2,$ this is the unit circle; for $n=3$ this is the unit sphere; in higher dimensions, this is the unit hypersphere.

The point $\mathbf a=(0, \ldots, 0, -1)$ belongs to the quadric (the choice of this point among other similar points is only a question of convenience). So, the equation $q(\mathbf a +\lambda \mathbf t)=0$ of the preceding section becomes

$$(\lambda t_1^2)+\cdots +(\lambda t_{n-1})^2+ (1-\lambda)^2-1=0.$$

By expanding the squares, simplifying the constant terms, dividing by $\lambda,$ and solving in $\lambda,$ one obtains

$$\lambda = \frac{2}{1+ t_1^2+ \cdots +t_{n-1}^2}.$$

Substituting this into $\mathbf x=\mathbf a +\lambda \mathbf t$ and simplifying the expression of the last coordinate, one obtains the parametric equation

$$\begin{cases}
x_1=\frac{2t_1}{1+ t_1^2+ \cdots +t_{n-1}^2}\\
\vdots\\
x_{n-1}=\frac{2 t_{n-1}}{1+ t_1^2+ \cdots +t_{n-1}^2}\\
x_n =\frac{1- t_1^2- \cdots -t_{n-1}^2}{1+ t_1^2+ \cdots +t_{n-1}^2}.
\end{cases}$$

By homogenizing, one obtains the projective parametrization

$$\begin{cases}
X_0=T_1^2+ \cdots +T_n^2\\
X_1=2T_1 T_n\\
\vdots\\
X_{n-1}=2T_{n-1}T_n\\
X_n =T_n^2- T_1^2- \cdots -T_{n-1}^2.
\end{cases}$$

A straightforward verification shows that this induces a bijection between the points of the quadric such that $X_n\neq -X_0$ and the points such that $T_n\neq 0$ in the projective space of the parameters. On the other hand, all values of $(T_1,\ldots, T_n)$ such that $T_n=0$ and $T_1^2+ \cdots +T_{n-1}^2\neq 0$ give the point $A.$

In the case of conic sections ($n=2$), there is exactly one point with $T_n=0.$ and one has a bijection between the circle and the projective line.

For $n>2,$ there are many points with $T_n=0,$ and thus many parameter values for the point $A.$ On the other hand, the other points of the quadric for which $X_n=-X_0$ (and thus $x_n=-1$) cannot be obtained for any value of the parameters. These points are the points of the intersection of the quadric and its tangent plane at $A.$ In this specific case, these points have nonreal complex coordinates, but it suffices to change one sign in the equation of the quadric for producing real points that are not obtained with the resulting parametrization.

== Rational points ==
A quadric is defined over a field $F$ if the coefficients of its equation belong to $F.$ When $F$ is the field $\Q$ of the rational numbers, one can suppose that the coefficients are integers by clearing denominators.

A point of a quadric defined over a field $F$ is said rational over $F$ if its coordinates belong to $F$. A rational point over the field $\R$ of the real numbers is called a real point.

A rational point over $\Q$ is called simply a rational point. By clearing denominators, one can suppose and one supposes generally that the projective coordinates of a rational point (in a quadric defined over $\Q$) are integers. Also, by clearing denominators of the coefficients, one supposes generally that all the coefficients of the equation of the quadric and the polynomials occurring in the parametrization are integers.

Finding the rational points of a projective quadric amounts thus to solving a Diophantine equation.

Given a rational point A over a quadric over a field F, the parametrization described in the preceding section provides rational points when the parameters are in F, and, conversely, every rational point of the quadric can be obtained from parameters in F, if the point is not in the tangent hyperplane at A.

It follows that, if a quadric has a rational point, it has many other rational points (infinitely many if F is infinite), and these points can be algorithmically generated as soon one knows one of them.

As said above, in the case of projective quadrics defined over $\Q,$ the parametrization takes the form

$$X_i=F_i(T_1, \ldots, T_n)\quad \text{for } i=0,\ldots,n,$$

where the $F_i$ are homogeneous polynomials of degree two with integer coefficients. Because of the homogeneity, one can consider only parameters that are setwise coprime integers. If $Q(X_0,\ldots, X_n)=0$ is the equation of the quadric, a solution of this equation is said primitive if its components are setwise coprime integers. The primitive solutions are in one to one correspondence with the rational points of the quadric (up to a change of sign of all components of the solution). The non-primitive integer solutions are obtained by multiplying primitive solutions by arbitrary integers; so they do not deserve a specific study. However, setwise coprime parameters can produce non-primitive solutions, and one may have to divide by a greatest common divisor to arrive at the associated primitive solution.

=== Pythagorean triples ===
This is well illustrated by Pythagorean triples. A Pythagorean triple is a triple $(a,b,c)$ of positive integers such that $a^2+b^2=c^2.$ A Pythagorean triple is primitive if $a, b, c$ are setwise coprime, or, equivalently, if any of the three pairs $(a,b),$ $(b,c)$ and $(a,c)$ is coprime.

By choosing $A=(-1, 0, 1)$ and $\mathbf t = (m, n)$, the above method provides the parametrization

$$\begin{cases}
a=m^2-n^2\\b=2mn\\c=m^2+n^2
\end{cases}$$

for the quadric of equation $a^2+b^2-c^2=0.$ (The names of variables and parameters are being changed from the above ones to those that are common when considering Pythagorean triples).

If m and n are coprime integers such that $m>n>0,$ the resulting triple is a Pythagorean triple. If one of m and n is even and the other is odd, this resulting triple is primitive; otherwise, m and n are both odd, and one obtains a primitive triple by dividing by 2.

In summary, the primitive Pythagorean triples with $b$ even are obtained as

$$a=m^2-n^2,\quad b=2mn,\quad c= m^2+n^2,$$

with m and n coprime integers such that one is even and $m>n>0$ (this is Euclid's formula). The primitive Pythagorean triples with $b$ odd are obtained as

$$a=\frac{m^2-n^2}{2},\quad b=mn, \quad c= \frac{m^2+n^2}2,$$

with m and n coprime odd integers such that $m>n>0.$

As the exchange of a and b transforms a Pythagorean triple into another Pythagorean triple, only one of the two cases is sufficient for producing all primitive Pythagorean triples up to the order of a and b.

== Projective quadrics over fields ==
The definition of a projective quadric in a real projective space (see above) can be formally adapted by defining a projective quadric in an n-dimensional projective space over a field. In order to omit dealing with coordinates, a projective quadric is usually defined by starting with a quadratic form on a vector space.

=== Quadratic form ===
Let $K$ be a field and $V$ a vector space over $K$. A mapping $q$ from $V$ to $K$ such that

(Q1) $\;q(\lambda\vec x)=\lambda^2q(\vec x )\;$for any $\lambda\in K$ and $\vec x \in V$.

(Q2) $\;f(\vec x,\vec y ):=q(\vec x+\vec y)-q(\vec x)-q(\vec y)\;$ is a bilinear form.

is called quadratic form. The bilinear form $f$ is symmetric.

In case of $\operatorname{char}K\ne2$ the bilinear form is $f(\vec x,\vec x)=2q(\vec x)$, i.e. $f$ and $q$ are mutually determined in a unique way.
In case of $\operatorname{char}K=2$ (that means: $1+1=0$) the bilinear form has the property $f(\vec x,\vec x)=0$, i.e. $f$ is symplectic.

For $V=K^n\$ and $\ \vec x=\sum_{i=1}^{n}x_i\vec e_i\quad$ ($\{\vec e_1,\ldots,\vec e_n\}$ is a base of $V$) $\ q$ has the familiar form

$q(\vec x)=\sum_{1=i\le k}^{n} a_{ik}x_ix_k\ \text{ with }\ a_{ik}:= f(\vec e_i,\vec e_k)\ \text{ for }\ i\ne k\ \text{ and }\ a_{ii}:= q(\vec e_i)\$ and
$$f(\vec x,\vec y)=\sum_{1=i\le k}^{n} a_{ik}(x_iy_k+x_ky_i)$$.

For example:

$$n=3,\quad q(\vec x)=x_1x_2-x^2_3, \quad f(\vec x,\vec y)=x_1y_2+x_2y_1-2x_3y_3\; .$$

=== n-dimensional projective space over a field ===
Let $K$ be a field, $2\le n\in\N$,

$V_{n+1}$ an (n + 1)-dimensional vector space over the field $K,$
$\langle\vec x\rangle$ the 1-dimensional subspace generated by $\vec 0\ne \vec x\in V_{n+1}$,
${\mathcal P}=\{\langle \vec x\rangle \mid \vec x \in V_{n+1}\},\$ the set of points ,
${\mathcal G}=\{ \text{2-dimensional subspaces of } V_{n+1}\},\$the set of lines.
$P_n(K)=({\mathcal P},{\mathcal G})\$ is the n-dimensional projective space over $K$.
The set of points contained in a $(k+1)$-dimensional subspace of $V_{n+1}$ is a $k$-dimensional subspace of $P_n(K)$. A 2-dimensional subspace is a plane.
In case of $\;n>3\;$ a $(n-1)$-dimensional subspace is called hyperplane.

=== Projective quadric ===
A quadratic form $q$ on a vector space $V_{n+1}$ defines a quadric $\mathcal Q$ in the associated projective space $\mathcal P,$ as the set of the points $\langle\vec x\rangle \in {\mathcal P}$ such that $q(\vec x)=0$. That is,

$$\mathcal Q=\{\langle\vec x\rangle \in {\mathcal P} \mid q(\vec x)=0\}.$$

Examples in $P_2(K)$.:
(E1): For $\;q(\vec x)=x_1x_2-x^2_3\;$ one obtains a conic.
(E2): For $\;q(\vec x)=x_1x_2\;$ one obtains the pair of lines with the equations $x_1=0$ and $x_2=0$, respectively. They intersect at point $\langle(0,0,1)^\text{T}\rangle$;

For the considerations below it is assumed that $\mathcal Q\ne \emptyset$.

=== Polar space ===
For point $P=\langle\vec p\rangle \in {\mathcal P}$ the set

$$P^\perp:=\{\langle\vec x\rangle\in {\mathcal P} \mid f(\vec p,\vec x)=0\}$$

is called polar space of $P$ (with respect to $q$).

If $\;f(\vec p,\vec x)=0\;$ for all $\vec x$, one obtains $P^\perp=\mathcal P$.

If $\;f(\vec p,\vec x)\ne 0\;$ for at least one $\vec x$, the equation $\;f(\vec p,\vec x)=0\;$is a non trivial linear equation which defines a hyperplane. Hence

$P^\perp$ is either a hyperplane or ${\mathcal P}$.

=== Intersection with a line ===
For the intersection of an arbitrary line $g$ with a real quadric $\mathcal Q$, the following cases may occur:

a) $g\cap \mathcal Q=\emptyset\;$ and $g$ is called exterior line
b) $g \subset \mathcal Q\;$ and $g$ is called a line in the quadric
c) $|g\cap \mathcal Q|=1\;$ and $g$ is called tangent line
d) $|g\cap \mathcal Q|=2\;$ and $g$ is called secant line.

Proof: Let $g$ be a line, which intersects $\mathcal Q$ at point $\;U=\langle\vec u\rangle\;$ and $\;V= \langle\vec v\rangle\;$ is a second point on $g$. From $\;q(\vec u)=0\;$ one obtains
$q(x\vec u+\vec v)=q(x\vec u)+q(\vec v)+f(x\vec u,\vec v)=q(\vec v)+xf(\vec u,\vec v)\; .$
I) In case of $g\subset U^\perp$ the equation $f(\vec u,\vec v)=0$ holds and it is $\; q(x\vec u+\vec v)=q(\vec v)\;$ for any $x\in K$. Hence either $\;q(x\vec u+\vec v)=0\;$ for any $x\in K$ or $\;q(x\vec u+\vec v)\ne 0\;$ for any $x\in K$, which proves b) and b').
II) In case of $g\not\subset U^\perp$ one obtains $f(\vec u,\vec v)\ne 0$ and the equation $\;q(x\vec u+\vec v)=q(\vec v)+xf(\vec u,\vec v)= 0\;$ has exactly one solution $x$. Hence: $|g\cap \mathcal Q|=2$, which proves c).

Additionally the proof shows:

A line $g$ through a point $P\in \mathcal Q$ is a tangent line if and only if $g\subset P^\perp$.

=== f-radical, q-radical ===
In the classical cases $K=\R$ or $\C$ there exists only one radical, because of $\operatorname{char}K\ne2$ and $f$ and $q$ are closely connected. In case of $\operatorname{char}K=2$ the quadric $\mathcal Q$ is not determined by $f$ (see above) and so one has to deal with two radicals:

a) $\mathcal R:=\{P\in{\mathcal P} \mid P^\perp=\mathcal P\}$ is a projective subspace. $\mathcal R$ is called f-radical of quadric $\mathcal Q$.
b) $\mathcal S:=\mathcal R\cap\mathcal Q$ is called singular radical or $q$-radical of $\mathcal Q$.
c) In case of $\operatorname{char}K\ne2$ one has $\mathcal R=\mathcal S$.

A quadric is called non-degenerate if $\mathcal S=\emptyset$.

Examples in $P_2(K)$ (see above):
(E1): For $\;q(\vec x)=x_1x_2-x^2_3\;$ (conic) the bilinear form is $f(\vec x,\vec y)=x_1y_2+x_2y_1-2x_3y_3\; .$
In case of $\operatorname{char}K\ne2$ the polar spaces are never $\mathcal P$. Hence $\mathcal R=\mathcal S=\empty$.
In case of $\operatorname{char}K=2$ the bilinear form is reduced to $f(\vec x,\vec y)=x_1y_2+x_2y_1\;$ and $\mathcal R=\langle(0,0,1)^\text{T}\rangle\notin \mathcal Q$. Hence $\mathcal R\ne \mathcal S=\empty \; .$ In this case the f-radical is the common point of all tangents, the so called knot.
In both cases $S=\empty$ and the quadric (conic) ist non-degenerate.
(E2): For $\;q(\vec x)=x_1x_2\;$ (pair of lines) the bilinear form is $f(\vec x,\vec y)=x_1y_2+x_2y_1\;$ and $\mathcal R=\langle(0,0,1)^\text{T}\rangle=\mathcal S\; ,$ the intersection point.
In this example the quadric is degenerate.

=== Symmetries ===
A quadric is a rather homogeneous object:

For any point $P\notin \mathcal Q\cup {\mathcal R}\;$ there exists an involutorial central collineation $\sigma_P$ with center $P$ and $\sigma_P(\mathcal Q)=\mathcal Q$.

Proof: Due to $P\notin \mathcal Q\cup {\mathcal R}$ the polar space $P^\perp$ is a hyperplane.

The linear mapping

$$\varphi: \vec x \rightarrow \vec x-\frac{f(\vec p,\vec x)}{q(\vec p)}\vec p$$

induces an involutorial central collineation $\sigma_P$ with axis $P^\perp$ and centre $P$ which leaves $\mathcal Q$ invariant.
In the case of $\operatorname{char}K\ne2$, the mapping $\varphi$ produces the familiar shape $\; \varphi: \vec x \rightarrow \vec x-2\frac{f(\vec p,\vec x)}{f(\vec p,\vec p)}\vec p\;$ with $\; \varphi(\vec p)=-\vec p$ and $\; \varphi(\vec x)=\vec x\;$ for any $\langle\vec x\rangle \in P^\perp$.

Remark:

a) An exterior line, a tangent line or a secant line is mapped by the involution $\sigma_P$ on an exterior, tangent and secant line, respectively.
b) ${\mathcal R}$ is pointwise fixed by $\sigma_P$.

=== q-subspaces and index of a quadric ===
A subspace $\;\mathcal U\;$ of $P_n(K)$ is called $q$-subspace if $\;\mathcal U\subset\mathcal Q\;$

For example: points on a sphere or lines on a hyperboloid (s. below).

Any two maximal $q$-subspaces have the same dimension $m$.

Let be $m$ the dimension of the maximal $q$-subspaces of $\mathcal Q$ then

The integer $\;i:=m+1\;$ is called index of $\mathcal Q$.

Theorem:

For the index $i$ of a non-degenerate quadric $\mathcal Q$ in $P_n(K)$ the following is true:

$$i\le \frac{n+1}{2}$$.

Let be $\mathcal Q$ a non-degenerate quadric in $P_n(K), n\ge 2$, and $i$ its index.

In case of $i=1$ quadric $\mathcal Q$ is called sphere (or oval conic if $n=2$).
In case of $i=2$ quadric $\mathcal Q$ is called hyperboloid (of one sheet).

Examples:

a) Quadric $\mathcal Q$ in $P_2(K)$ with form $\;q(\vec x)=x_1x_2-x^2_3\;$ is non-degenerate with index 1.
b) If polynomial $\;p(\xi)=\xi^2+a_0\xi+b_0\;$ is irreducible over $K$ the quadratic form $\;q(\vec x)=x^2_1+a_0x_1x_2+b_0x^2_2-x_3x_4\;$ gives rise to a non-degenerate quadric $\mathcal Q$ in $P_3(K)$ of index 1 (sphere). For example: $\;p(\xi)=\xi^2+1\;$ is irreducible over $\R$ (but not over $\C$ !).
c) In $P_3(K)$ the quadratic form $\;q(\vec x)=x_1x_2+x_3x_4\;$ generates a hyperboloid.

=== Generalization of quadrics: quadratic sets ===
It is not reasonable to formally extend the definition of quadrics to spaces over genuine skew fields (division rings). Because one would obtain secants bearing more than 2 points of the quadric which is totally different from usual quadrics. The reason is the following statement.

A division ring $K$ is commutative if and only if any equation $x^2+ax+b=0, \ a,b \in K$, has at most two solutions.

There are generalizations of quadrics: quadratic sets. A quadratic set is a set of points of a projective space with the same geometric properties as a quadric: every line intersects a quadratic set in at most two points or is contained in the set.

== See also ==
- Klein quadric
- Rotation of axes
- Superquadrics
- Steiner conic
- Translation of axes

== Bibliography ==
- M. Audin: Geometry, Springer, Berlin, 2002, ISBN 978-3-540-43498-6, p. 200.
- M. Berger: Problem Books in Mathematics, ISSN 0941-3502, Springer New York, pp. 79–84.
- A. Beutelspacher, U. Rosenbaum: Projektive Geometrie, Vieweg + Teubner, Braunschweig u. a. 1992, ISBN 3-528-07241-5, p. 159.
- P. Dembowski: Finite Geometries, Springer, 1968, ISBN 978-3-540-61786-0, p. 43.
- Iskovskikh, V.A. (2001) [1994], "Quadric", Encyclopedia of Mathematics, EMS Press
- Weisstein, Eric W. "Quadric". MathWorld.
