= Hyperboloid =

Unbounded quadric surface

Hyperboloid of one sheet	conical surface in between	Hyperboloid of two sheets

In geometry, a hyperboloid of revolution, sometimes called a circular hyperboloid, is the surface generated by rotating a hyperbola around one of its principal axes. A hyperboloid is the surface obtained from a hyperboloid of revolution by deforming it by means of directional scalings, or more generally, of an affine transformation.

A hyperboloid is a quadric surface, that is, a surface defined as the zero set of a polynomial of degree two in three variables. Among quadric surfaces, a hyperboloid is characterized by not being a cone or a cylinder, having a center of symmetry, and intersecting many planes into hyperbolas. A hyperboloid has three pairwise perpendicular axes of symmetry, and three pairwise perpendicular planes of symmetry.

Given a hyperboloid, one can choose a Cartesian coordinate system such that the hyperboloid is defined by one of the following equations:
$${x^2 \over a^2} + {y^2 \over b^2} - {z^2 \over c^2} =  1,$$
or
$${x^2 \over a^2} + {y^2 \over b^2} - {z^2 \over c^2} = -1.$$
The coordinate axes are axes of symmetry of the hyperboloid and the origin is the center of symmetry of the hyperboloid. In any case, the hyperboloid is asymptotic to the cone of the equations:
$${x^2 \over a^2} + {y^2 \over b^2} - {z^2 \over c^2} = 0 .$$

One has a hyperboloid of revolution if and only if $a^2=b^2.$ Otherwise, the axes are uniquely defined (up to the exchange of the x-axis and the y-axis).

There are two kinds of hyperboloids. In the first case (+1 in the right-hand side of the equation): a one-sheet hyperboloid, also called a hyperbolic hyperboloid. It is a connected surface, which has a negative Gaussian curvature at every point. This implies near every point the intersection of the hyperboloid and its tangent plane at the point consists of two branches of curve that have distinct tangents at the point. In the case of the one-sheet hyperboloid, these branches of curves are lines and thus the one-sheet hyperboloid is a doubly ruled surface.

In the second case (−1 in the right-hand side of the equation): a two-sheet hyperboloid, also called an elliptic hyperboloid. The surface has two connected components and a positive Gaussian curvature at every point. The surface is convex in the sense that the tangent plane at every point intersects the surface only in this point.

== Parametric representations ==
Animation of a hyperboloid of revolution

Cartesian coordinates for the hyperboloids can be defined, similar to spherical coordinates, keeping the azimuth angle θ ∈ [0, 2π), but changing inclination v into hyperbolic trigonometric functions:

One-surface hyperboloid: v ∈ (−∞, ∞)
$$\begin{align} x&=a \cosh v \cos\theta \\ y&=b \cosh v \sin\theta \\ z&=c \sinh v \end{align}$$

Two-surface hyperboloid: v ∈ [0, ∞)
$$\begin{align} x&=a \sinh v \cos\theta \\ y&=b \sinh v \sin\theta \\ z&=\pm c \cosh v \end{align}$$

hyperboloid of one sheet: generation by a rotating hyperbola (top) and line (bottom: red or blue)

hyperboloid of one sheet: plane sections

Straight pencils arranged in a ring lean against one another so their edges trace a one-sheet hyperboloid.

The following parametric representation includes hyperboloids of one sheet, two sheets, and their common boundary cone, each with the $z$-axis as the axis of symmetry:
$$\mathbf x(s,t) =
\left( \begin{array}{lll}
a \sqrt{s^2+d} \cos t\\
b \sqrt{s^2+d} \sin t\\
c s
\end{array} \right)$$

- For $d>0$ one obtains a hyperboloid of one sheet,
- For $d<0$ a hyperboloid of two sheets, and
- For $d=0$ a double cone.

One can obtain a parametric representation of a hyperboloid with a different coordinate axis as the axis of symmetry by shuffling the position of the $c s$ term to the appropriate component in the equation above.

=== Generalised equations ===
More generally, an arbitrarily oriented hyperboloid, centered at v, is defined by the equation
$$(\mathbf{x}-\mathbf{v})^\mathrm{T} A (\mathbf{x}-\mathbf{v}) = 1,$$
where A is a matrix and x, v are vectors.

The eigenvectors of A define the principal directions of the hyperboloid and the eigenvalues of A are the reciprocals of the squares of the semi-axes: ${1/a^2}$, ${1/b^2}$ and ${1/c^2}$. The one-sheet hyperboloid has two positive eigenvalues and one negative eigenvalue. The two-sheet hyperboloid has one positive eigenvalue and two negative eigenvalues.

== Properties ==
=== Hyperboloid of one sheet ===
==== Lines on the surface ====
- A hyperboloid of one sheet contains two pencils of lines. It is a doubly ruled surface.

If the hyperboloid has the equation ${x^2 \over a^2} + {y^2 \over b^2} - {z^2 \over c^2}= 1$ then the lines
$$g^{\pm}_{\alpha}:
\mathbf{x}(t) = \begin{pmatrix} a\cos\alpha \\ b\sin\alpha \\ 0\end{pmatrix}
+ t\cdot \begin{pmatrix} -a\sin\alpha\\ b\cos\alpha\\ \pm c\end{pmatrix}\ ,\quad t\in \R,\ 0\le \alpha\le 2\pi\$$
are contained in the surface.

In case $a = b$ the hyperboloid is a surface of revolution and can be generated by rotating one of the two lines $g^{+}_{0}$ or $g^{-}_{0}$, which are skew to the rotation axis (see picture). This property is called Wren's theorem. The more common generation of a one-sheet hyperboloid of revolution is rotating a hyperbola around its semi-minor axis (see picture; rotating the hyperbola around its other axis gives a two-sheet hyperbola of revolution).

A hyperboloid of one sheet is projectively equivalent to a hyperbolic paraboloid.

==== Plane sections ====
For simplicity the plane sections of the unit hyperboloid with equation $\ H_1: x^2+y^2-z^2=1$ are considered. Because a hyperboloid in general position is an affine image of the unit hyperboloid, the result applies to the general case, too.

- A plane with a slope less than 1 (1 is the slope of the lines on the hyperboloid) intersects $H_1$ in an ellipse,
- A plane with a slope equal to 1 containing the origin intersects $H_1$ in a pair of parallel lines,
- A plane with a slope equal 1 not containing the origin intersects $H_1$ in a parabola,
- A tangential plane intersects $H_1$ in a pair of intersecting lines,
- A non-tangential plane with a slope greater than 1 intersects $H_1$ in a hyperbola.

Obviously, any one-sheet hyperboloid of revolution contains circles. This is also true, but less obvious, in the general case (see circular section).

=== Hyperboloid of two sheets ===
hyperboloid of two sheets: generation by rotating a hyperbola

hyperboloid of two sheets: plane sections

The hyperboloid of two sheets does not contain lines. The discussion of plane sections can be performed for the unit hyperboloid of two sheets with equation
$$H_2: \ x^2+y^2-z^2 = -1.$$
which can be generated by a rotating hyperbola around one of its axes (the one that cuts the hyperbola)

- A plane with slope less than 1 (1 is the slope of the asymptotes of the generating hyperbola) intersects $H_2$ either in an ellipse or in a point or not at all,
- A plane with slope equal to 1 containing the origin (midpoint of the hyperboloid) does not intersect $H_2$,
- A plane with slope equal to 1 not containing the origin intersects $H_2$ in a parabola,
- A plane with slope greater than 1 intersects $H_2$ in a hyperbola.

Obviously, any two-sheet hyperboloid of revolution contains circles. This is also true, but less obvious, in the general case (see circular section).

Remark: A hyperboloid of two sheets is projectively equivalent to a sphere.

=== Other properties ===
==== Symmetries ====
The hyperboloids with equations
$$\frac{x^2}{a^2} + \frac{y^2}{b^2} - \frac{z^2}{c^2} = 1 , \quad \frac{x^2}{a^2} + \frac{y^2}{b^2} - \frac{z^2}{c^2} = -1$$
are

- pointsymmetric to the origin,
- symmetric to the coordinate planes and
- rotational symmetric to the z-axis and symmetric to any plane containing the z-axis, in case of $a=b$ (hyperboloid of revolution).

==== Curvature ====
Whereas the Gaussian curvature of a hyperboloid of one sheet is negative, that of a two-sheet hyperboloid is positive. In spite of its positive curvature, the hyperboloid of two sheets with another suitably chosen metric can also be used as a model for hyperbolic geometry.

== In more than three dimensions ==
Hyperboloids are frequently found in mathematics of higher dimensions. For example, in a pseudo-Euclidean space one has the use of a quadratic form:
$$q(x) = \left(x_1^2+\cdots + x_k^2\right)-\left(x_{k+1}^2+\cdots + x_n^2\right), \quad k < n .$$
When c is any constant, then the part of the space given by
$$\lbrace x \ :\ q(x) = c \rbrace$$
is called a hyperboloid. The degenerate case corresponds to c = 0.

As an example, consider the following passage:

... the velocity vectors always lie on a surface which Minkowski calls a four-dimensional hyperboloid since, expressed in terms of purely real coordinates (y_{1}, ..., y_{4}), its equation is y^{2}_{1} + y^{2}_{2} + y^{2}_{3} − y^{2}_{4} = −1, analogous to the hyperboloid y^{2}_{1} + y^{2}_{2} − y^{2}_{3} = −1 of three-dimensional space. (Note: Minkowski used the term "four-dimensional hyperboloid" only once, in a posthumously-published typescript and this was non-standard usage, as Minkowski's hyperboloid is a three-dimensional submanifold of a four-dimensional Minkowski space $M^4.$)

However, the term quasi-sphere is also used in this context since the sphere and hyperboloid have some commonality (See § Relation to the sphere below).

== Hyperboloid structures ==
One-sheeted hyperboloids are used in construction, with the structures called hyperboloid structures. A hyperboloid is a doubly ruled surface; thus, it can be built with straight steel beams, producing a strong structure at a lower cost than other methods. Examples include cooling towers, especially of power stations, and many other structures.

Gallery of one sheet hyperboloid structures

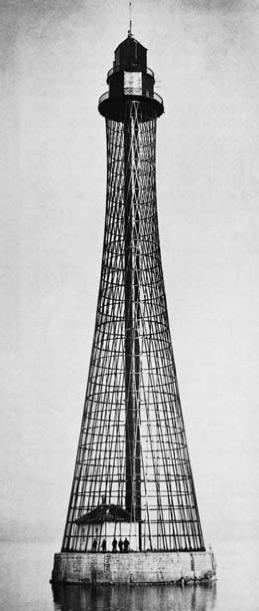
The Adziogol Lighthouse, Ukraine, 1911.

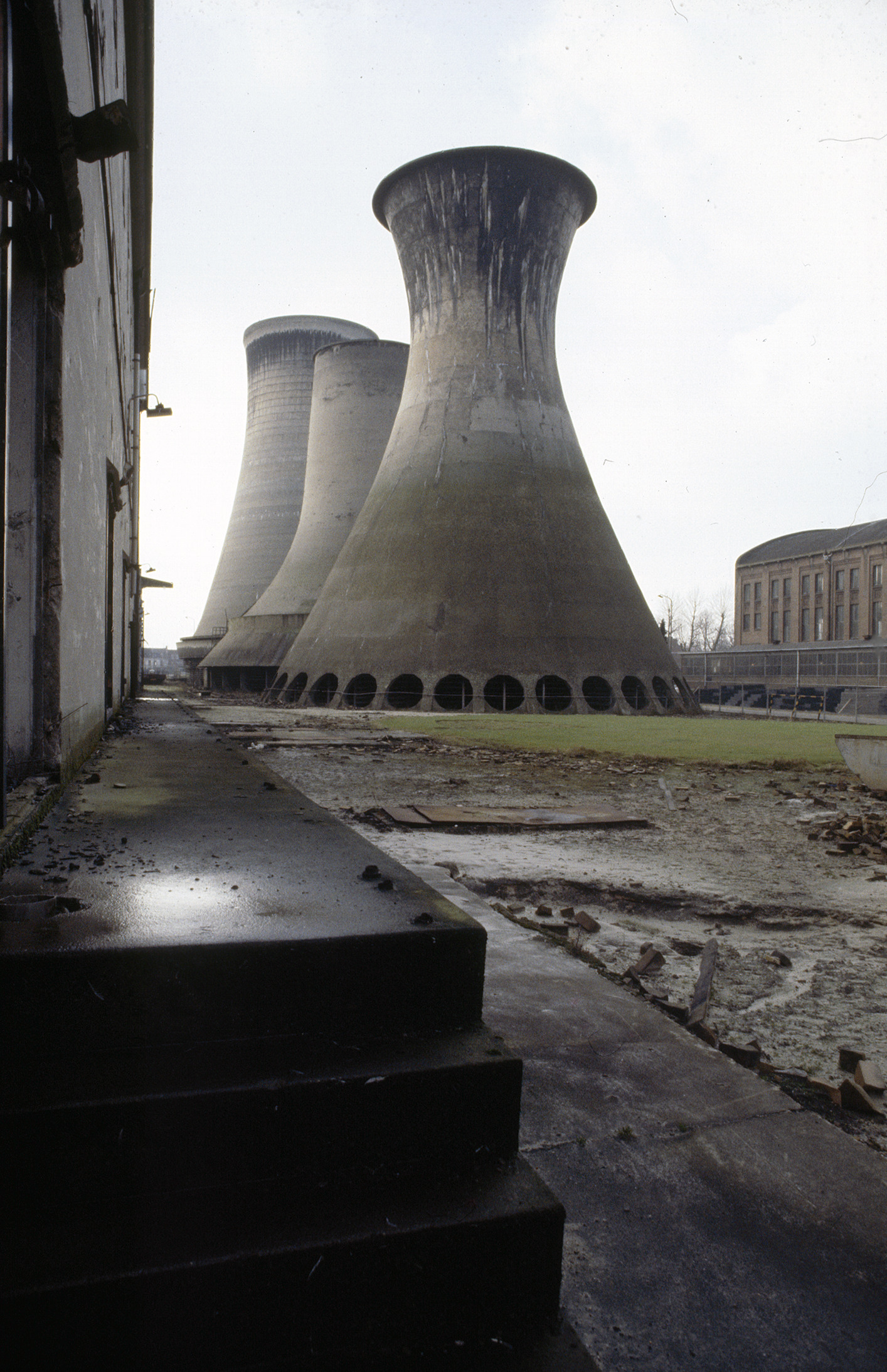
The first 1916 patented Van Iterson cooling tower of DSM Emma in Heerlen, The Netherlands, 1918

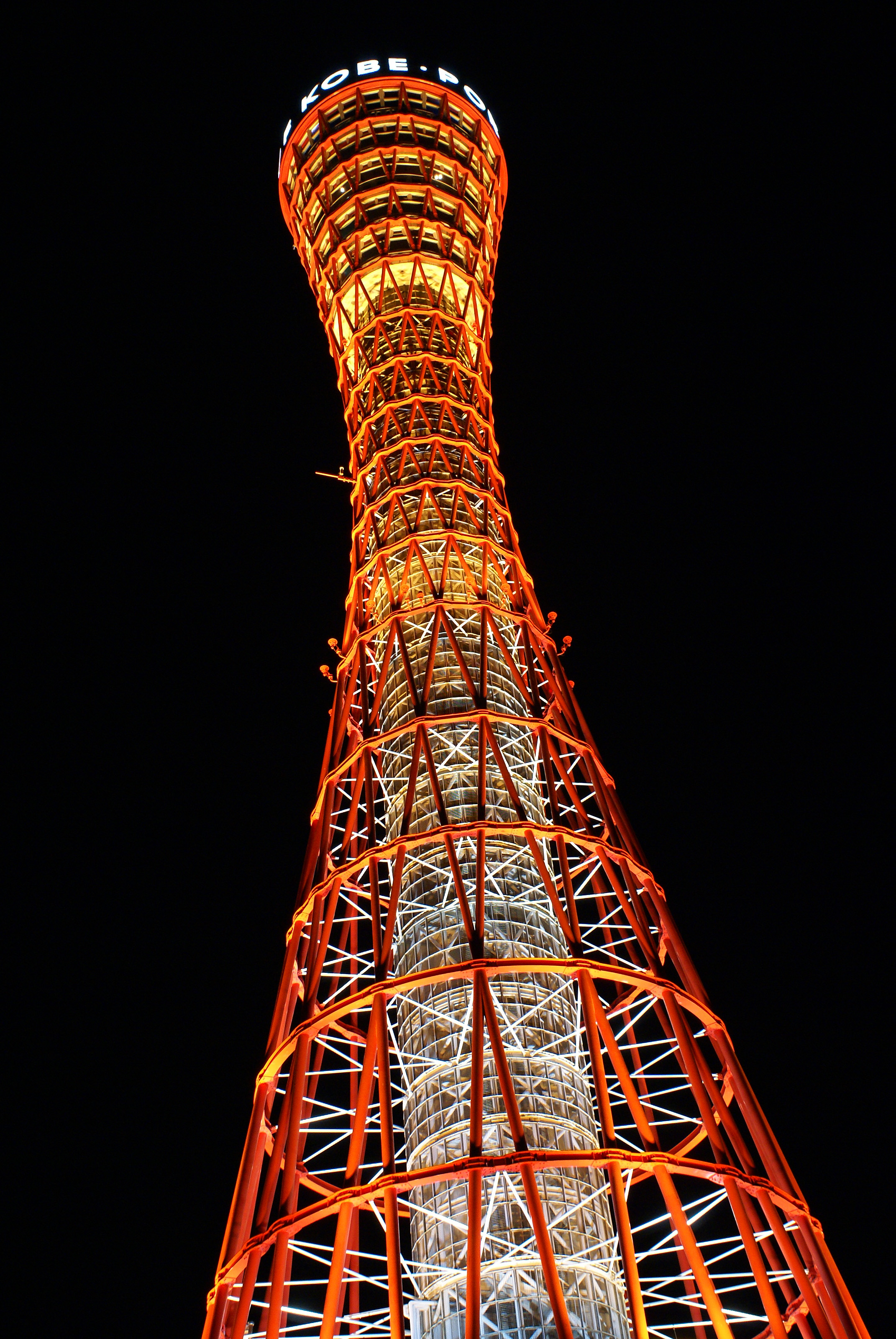
Kobe Port Tower, Japan, 1963.

Saint Louis Science Center's James S. McDonnell Planetarium, St. Louis, Missouri, 1963.

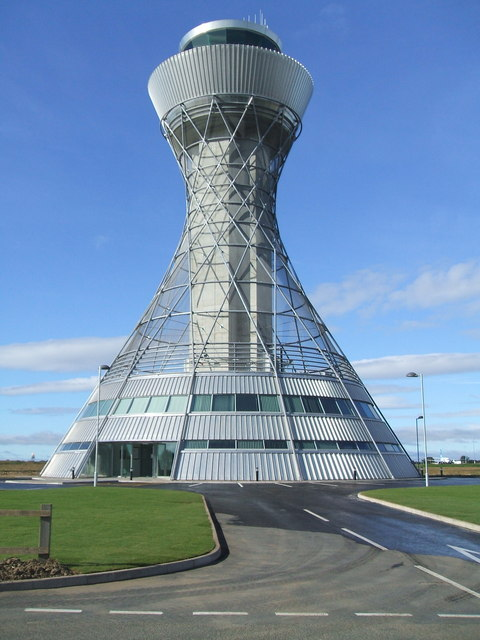
Newcastle International Airport control tower, Newcastle upon Tyne, England, 1967.

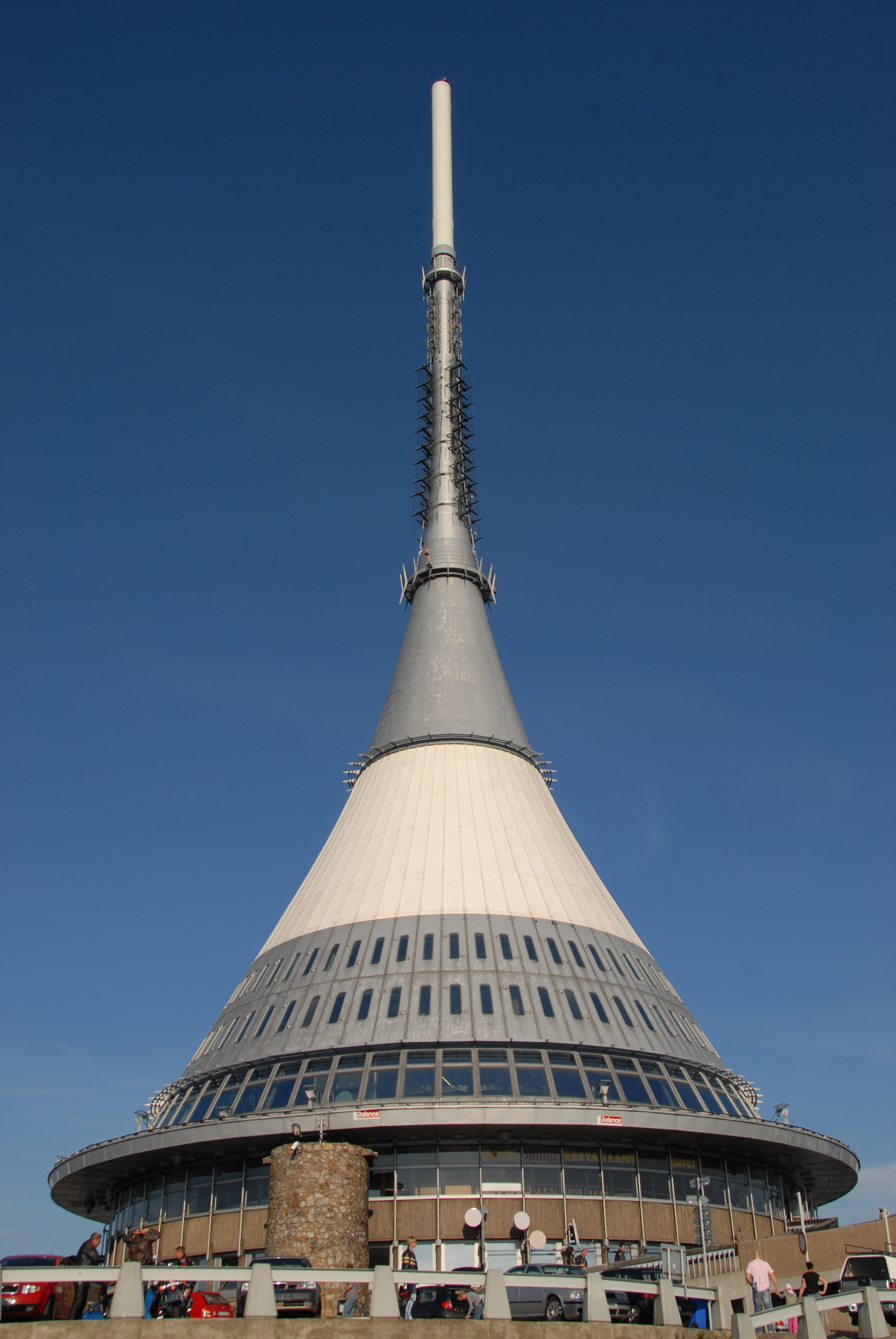
Ještěd Transmission Tower, Czech Republic, 1968.

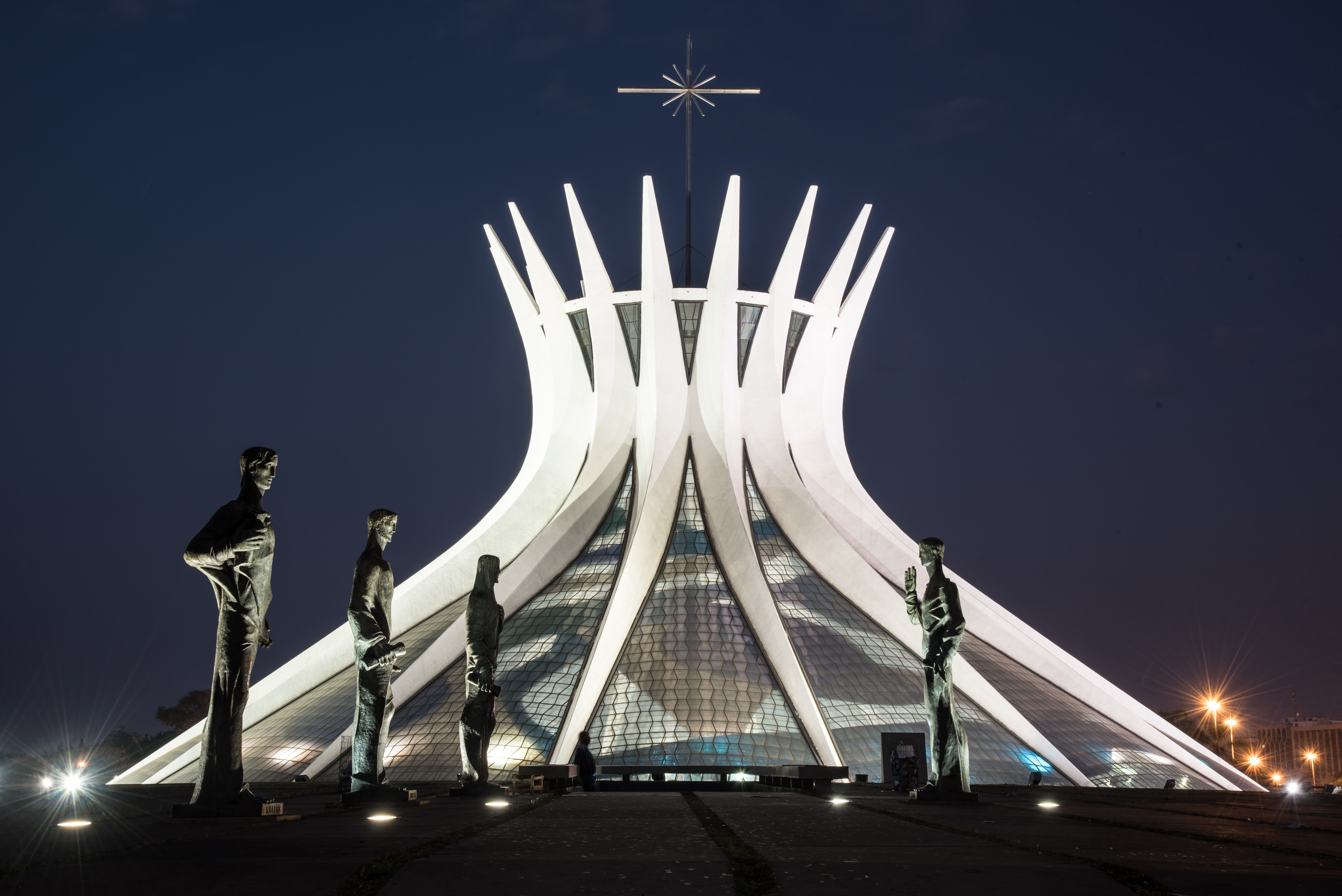
Cathedral of Brasília, Brazil, 1970.

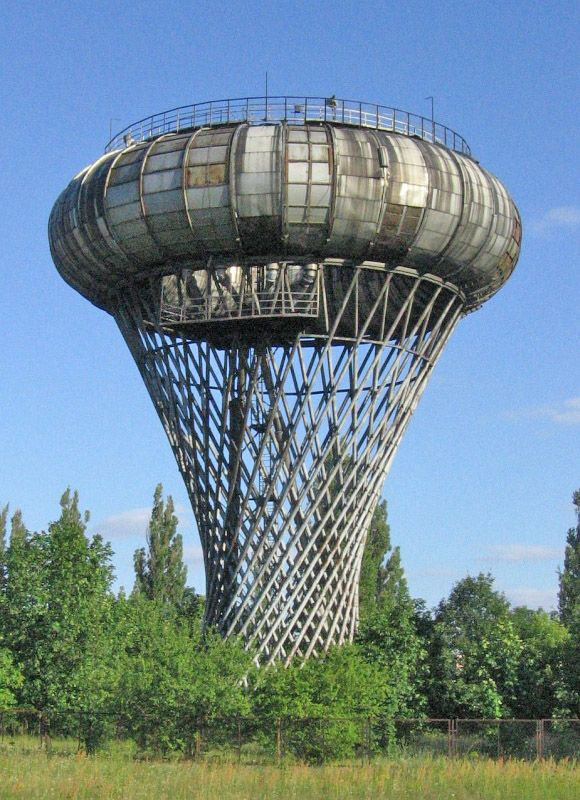
Hyperboloid water tower with toroidal tank, Ciechanów, Poland, 1972.

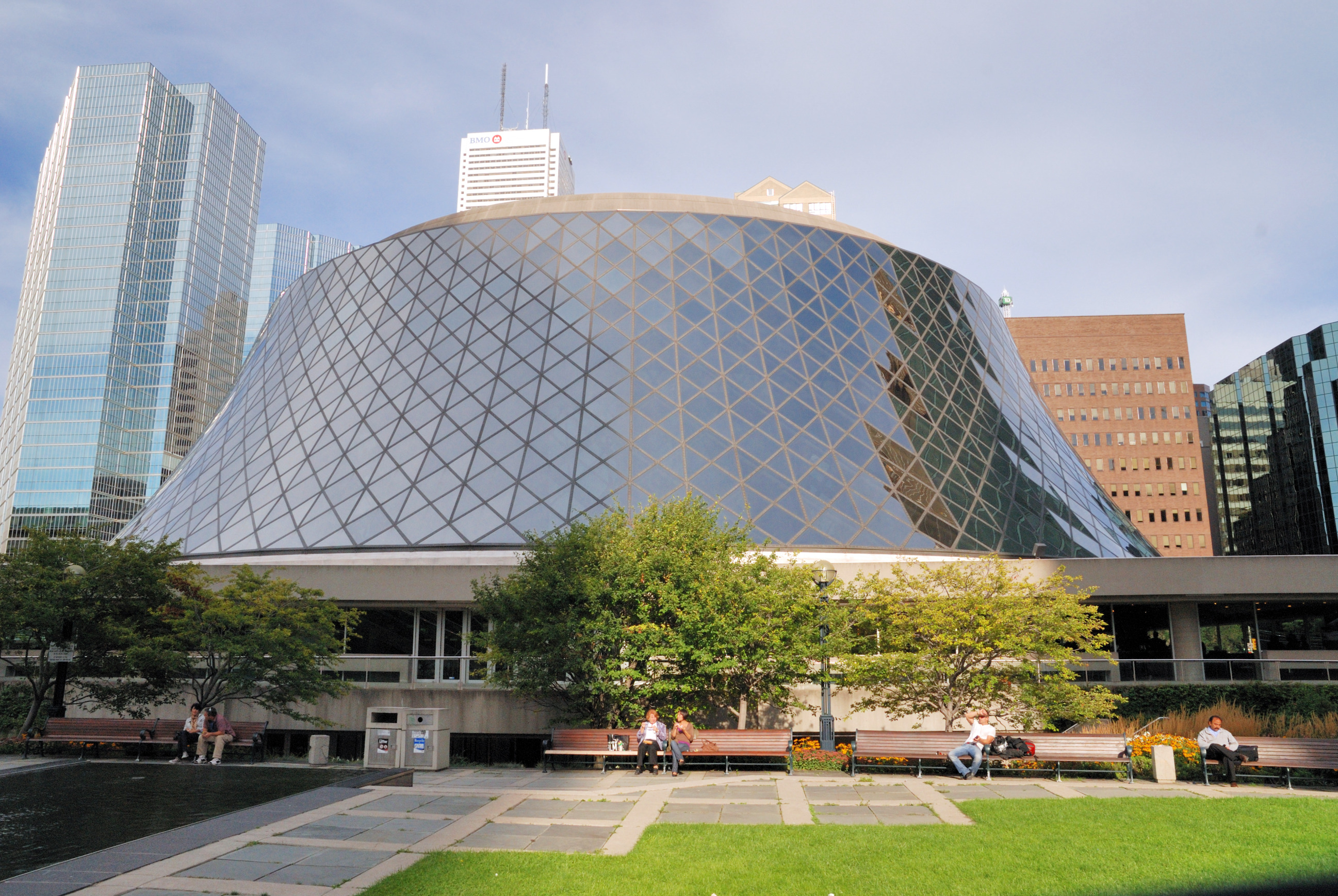
Roy Thomson Hall, Toronto, Canada, 1982.

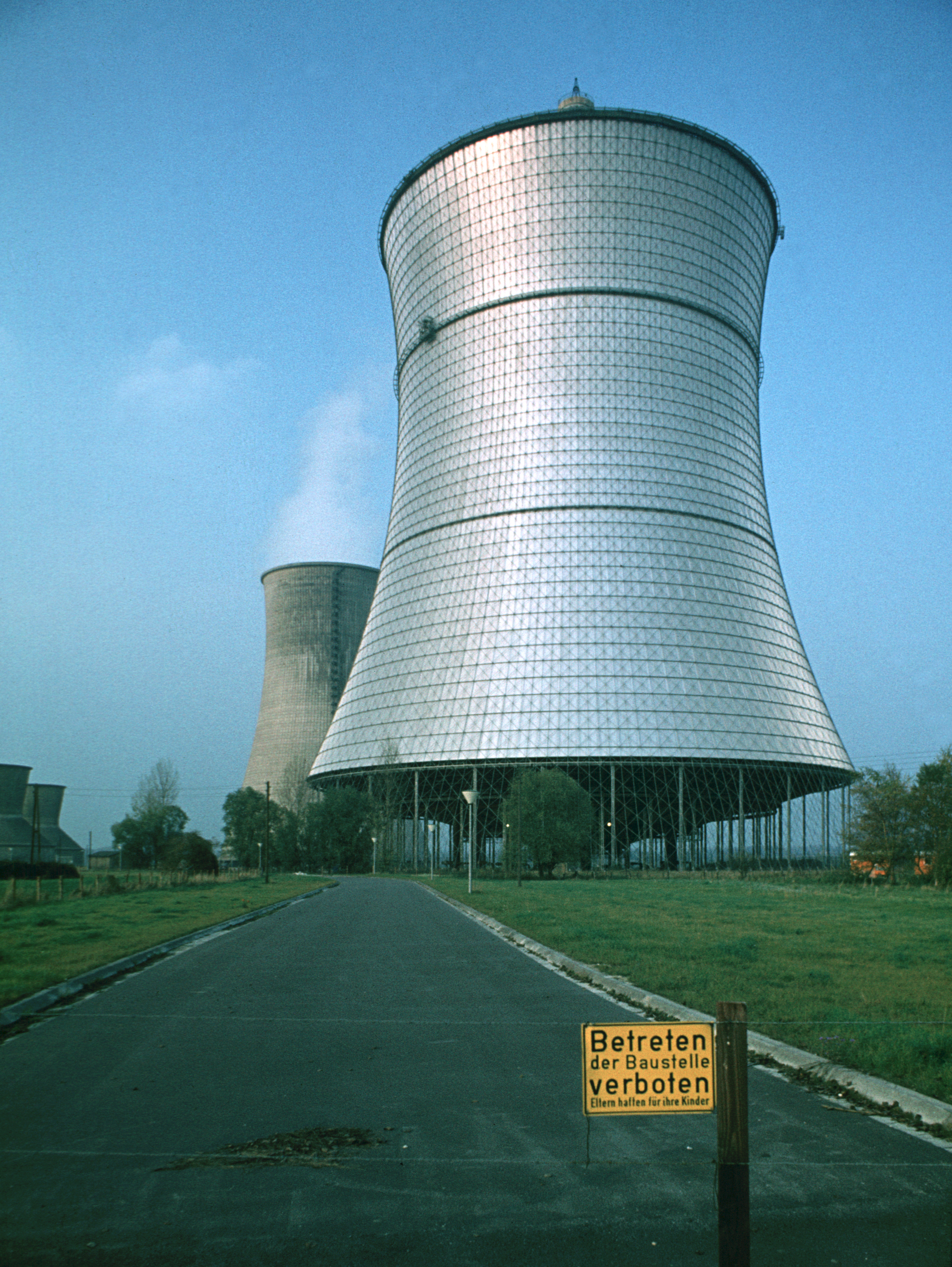
The THTR-300 cooling tower for the now decommissioned thorium nuclear reactor in Hamm-Uentrop, Germany, 1983.

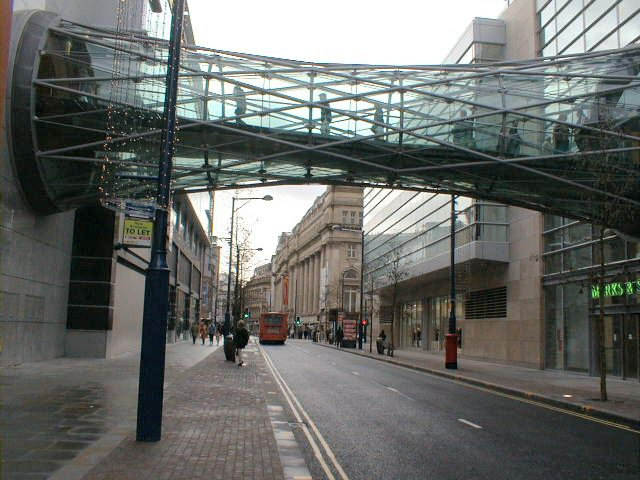
The Corporation Street Bridge, Manchester, England, 1999.

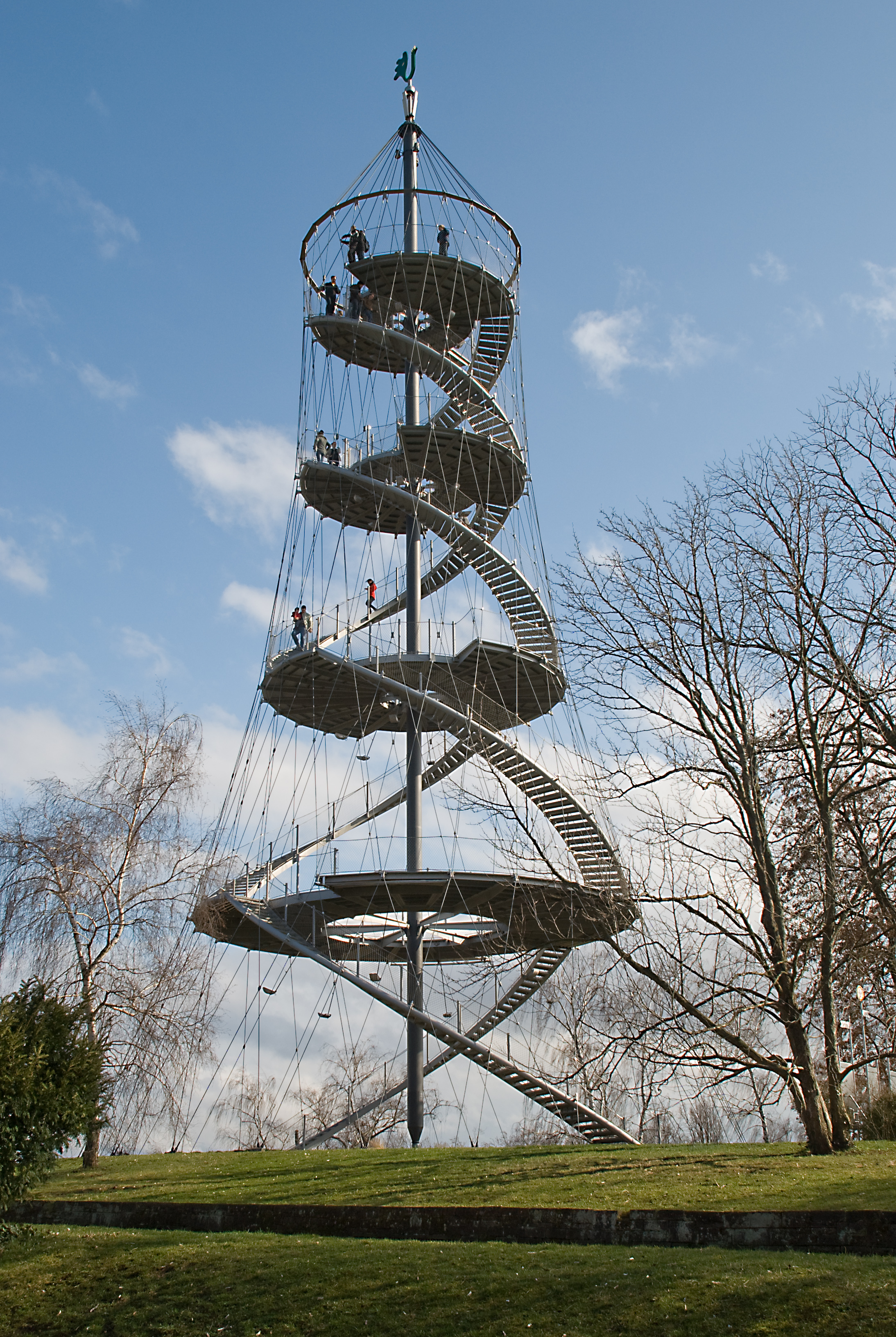
The Killesberg observation tower, Stuttgart, Germany, 2001.

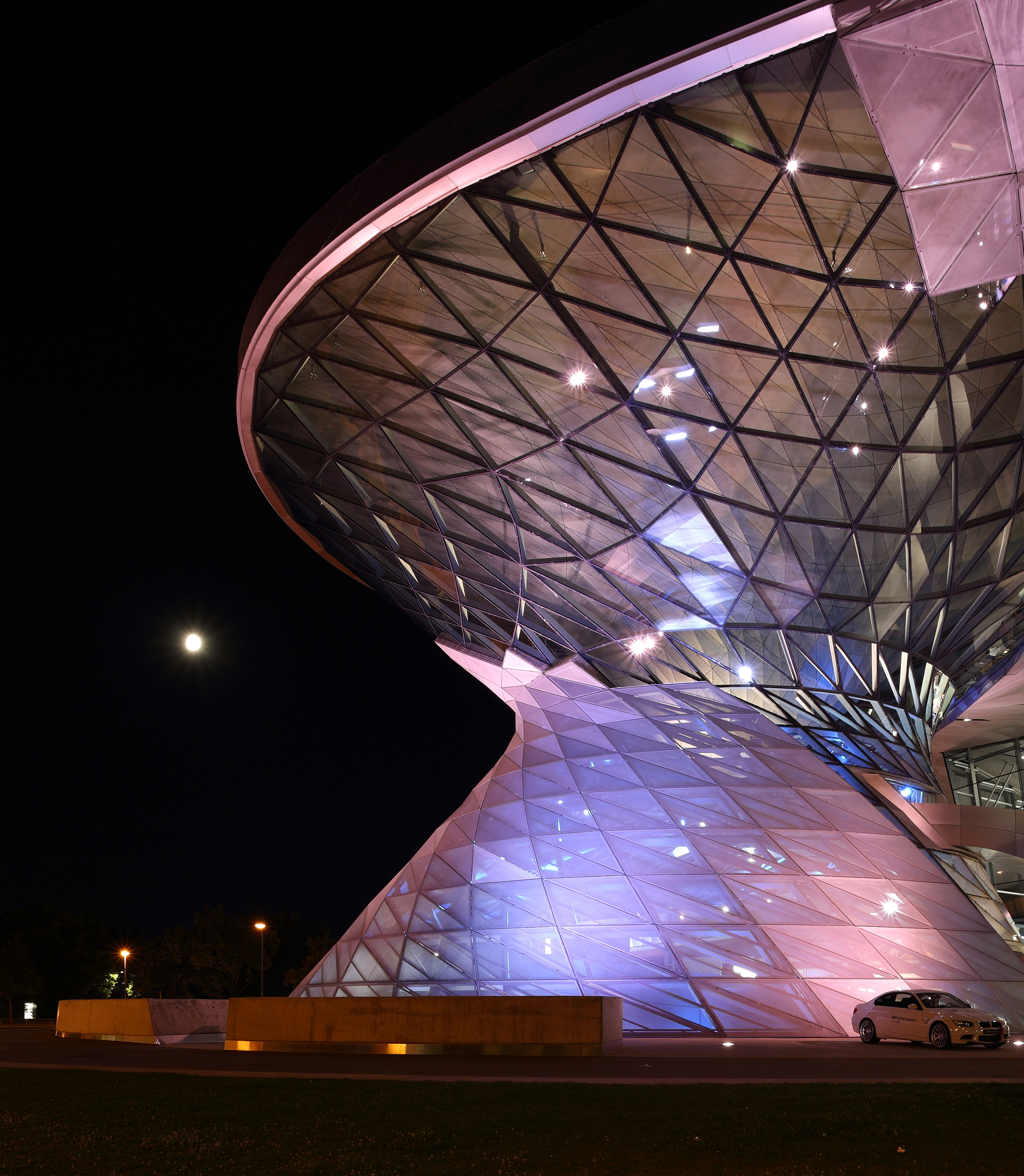
BMW Welt, (BMW World), museum and event venue, Munich, Germany, 2007.

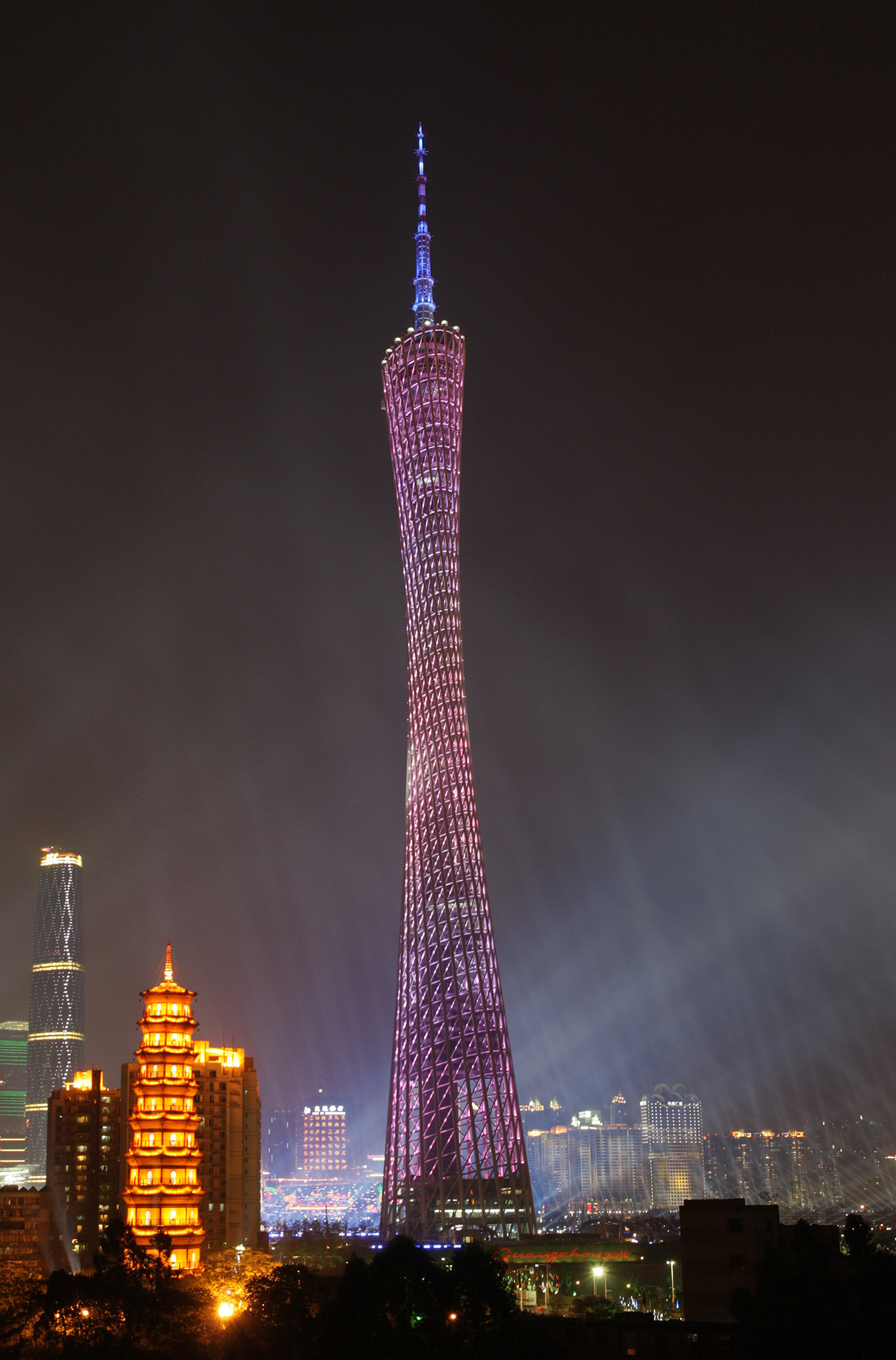
The Canton Tower, China, 2010.

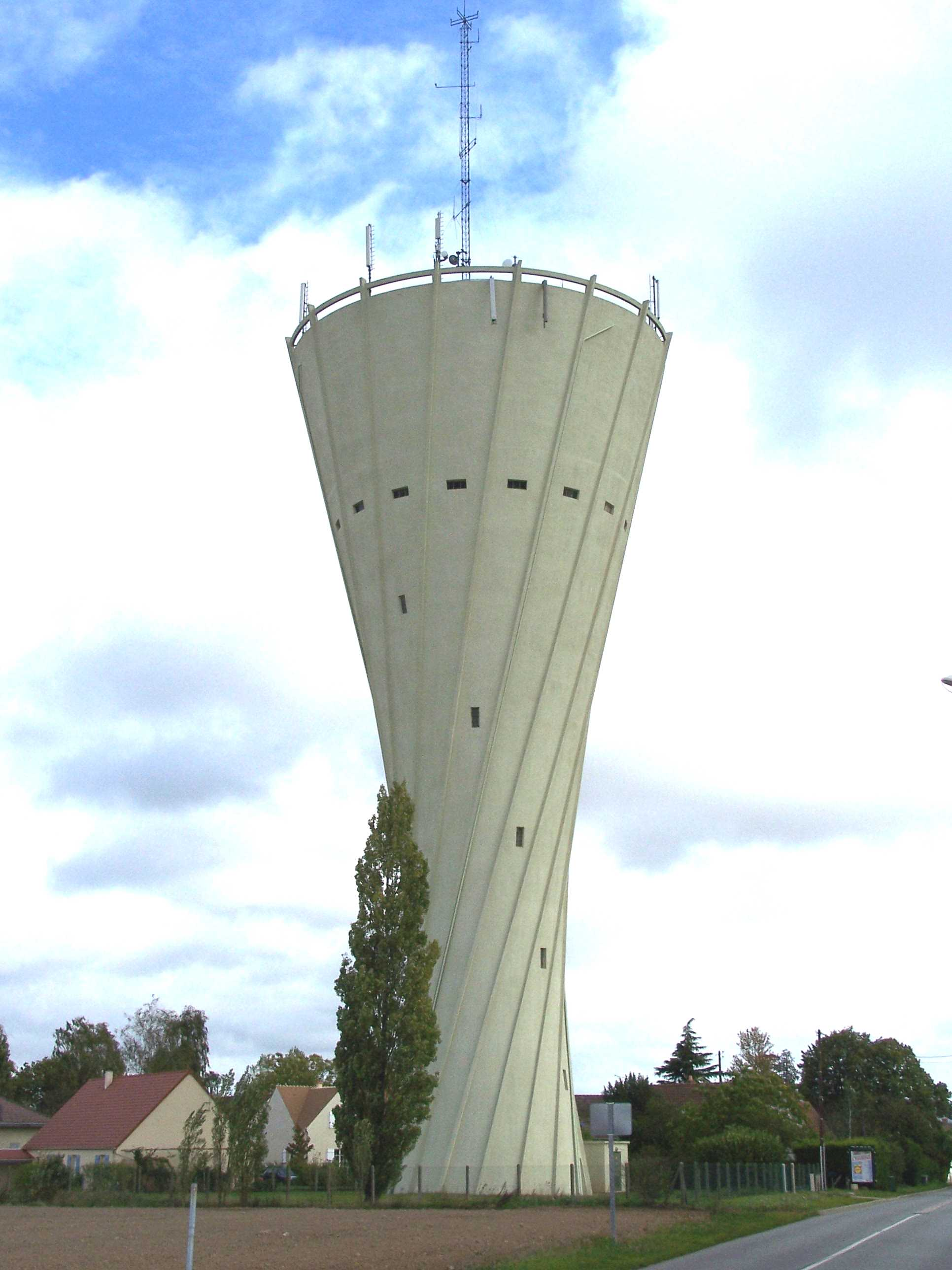
The Essarts-le-Roi water tower, France.

== Relation to the sphere ==
In 1853 William Rowan Hamilton published his Lectures on Quaternions which included presentation of biquaternions. The following passage from page 673 shows how Hamilton uses biquaternion algebra and vectors from quaternions to produce hyperboloids from the equation of a sphere:

... the equation of the unit sphere ρ^{2} + 1 = 0, and change the vector ρ to a bivector form, such as σ + τ √−1. The equation of the sphere then breaks up into the system of the two following,

σ^{2} − τ^{2} + 1 = 0, S.στ = 0;

and suggests our considering σ and τ as two real and rectangular vectors, such that

Tτ = (Tσ^{2} − 1 )^{1/2}.

Hence it is easy to infer that if we assume σ || λ, where λ is a vector in a given position, the new real vector σ + τ will terminate on the surface of a double-sheeted and equilateral hyperboloid; and that if, on the other hand, we assume τ || λ, then the locus of the extremity of the real vector σ + τ will be an equilateral but single-sheeted hyperboloid. The study of these two hyperboloids is, therefore, in this way connected very simply, through biquaternions, with the study of the sphere; ...

In this passage S is the operator giving the scalar part of a quaternion, and T is the "tensor", now called norm, of a quaternion.

A modern view of the unification of the sphere and hyperboloid uses the idea of a conic section as a slice of a quadratic form. Instead of a conical surface, one requires conical hypersurfaces in four-dimensional space with points p = (w, x, y, z) ∈ R^{4} determined by quadratic forms. First consider the conical hypersurface

- $P = \left\{ p \; : \; w^2 = x^2 + y^2 + z^2 \right\}$ and
- $H_r = \lbrace p \ :\ w = r \rbrace ,$ which is a hyperplane.

Then $P \cap H_r$ is the sphere with radius r. On the other hand, the conical hypersurface

$Q = \lbrace p \ :\ w^2 + z^2 = x^2 + y^2 \rbrace$ provides that $Q \cap H_r$ is a hyperboloid.

In the theory of quadratic forms, a unit quasi-sphere is the subset of a quadratic space X consisting of the x ∈ X such that the quadratic norm of x is one.

== See also ==
- List of surfaces
- Ellipsoid
- Paraboloid / Hyperbolic paraboloid
- Regulus
- Rotation of axes
- Split-quaternion § Profile
- Translation of axes
- De Sitter space
- Light cone
