= List of surfaces =

This is a list of surfaces in mathematics. They are divided into minimal surfaces, ruled surfaces, non-orientable surfaces, quadrics, pseudospherical surfaces, algebraic surfaces, and other types of surfaces.

== Minimal surfaces ==
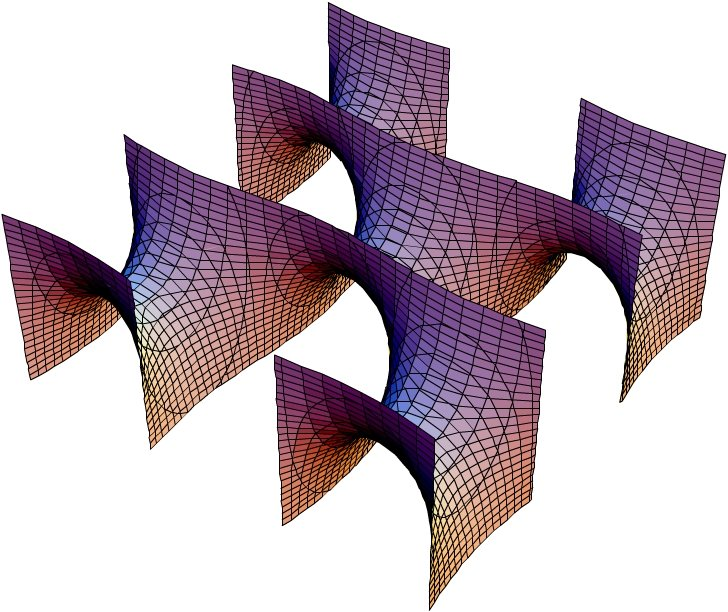
A Scherk surface

- Catalan's minimal surface
- Costa's minimal surface
- Catenoid
- Enneper surface
- Gyroid
- Helicoid
- Lidinoid
- Riemann's minimal surface
- Saddle tower
- Scherk surface
- Schwarz minimal surface
- Triply periodic minimal surface

== Ruled surfaces ==
A right conoid

- Catalan surface
- Right conoid
- Conical surface
- Helicoid
- Developable rollers (sphericon, oloid)
- Hyperboloid of one sheet (doubly ruled)
- Hyperbolic paraboloid (doubly ruled)
- Rational normal scroll
- Regulus

== Non-orientable surfaces ==
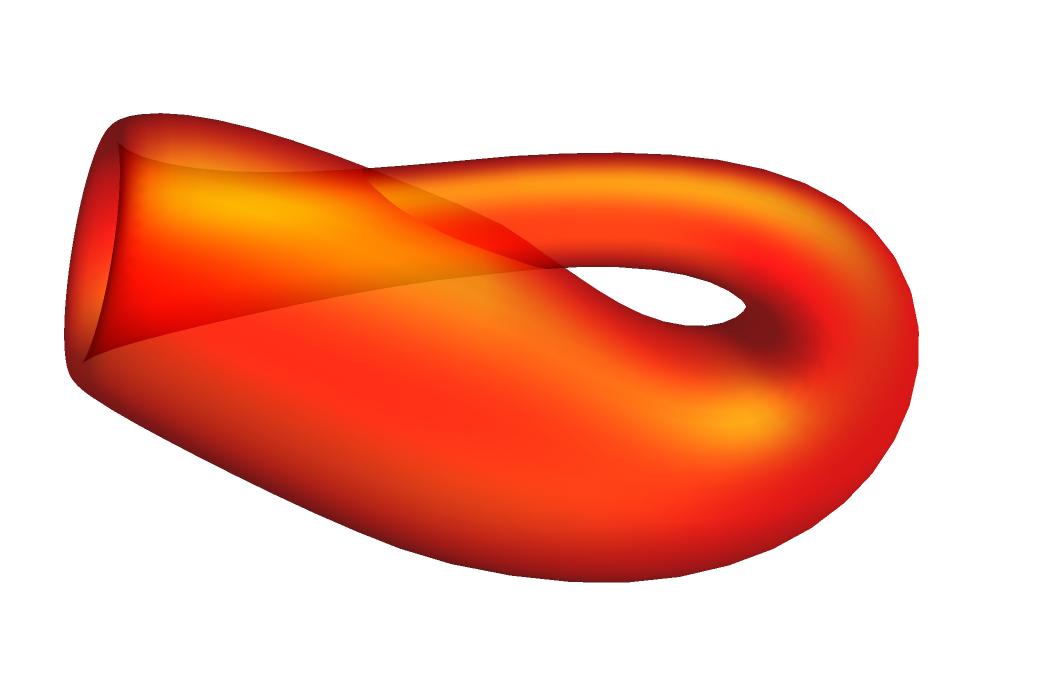
A Klein bottle

- Möbius strip
- Klein bottle
- Real projective plane
  - Cross-cap
  - Roman surface
  - Boy's surface

== Quadrics ==
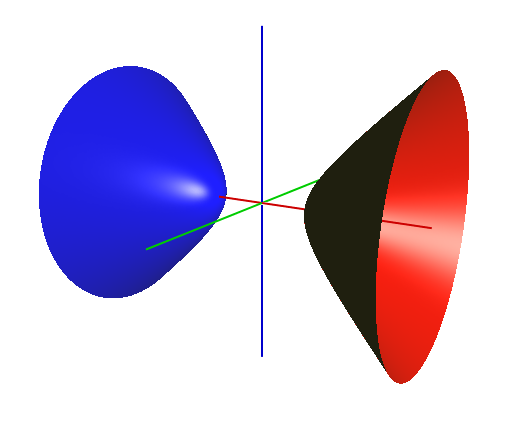
A hyperboloid of two sheets

- Sphere
- Spheroid
  - Oblate spheroid
  - Prolate spheroid
- Ellipsoid
- Cone (geometry)
- Hyperboloid of one sheet
- Hyperboloid of two sheets
- Hyperbolic paraboloid (a ruled surface)
- Paraboloid

== Pseudospherical surfaces ==
- Dini's surface
- Pseudosphere

== Algebraic surfaces ==
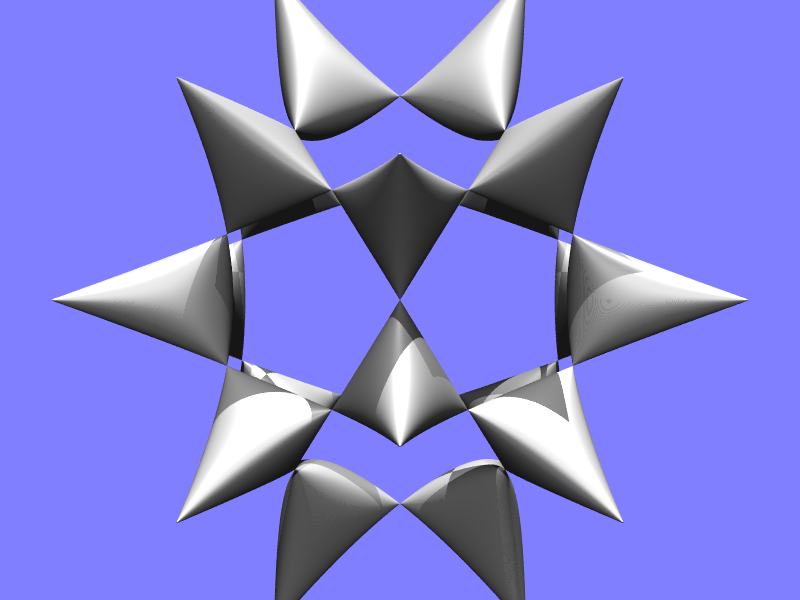
The Barth sextic

- Cayley cubic
- Barth sextic
- Clebsch cubic
- Monkey saddle (saddle-like surface for 3 legs.)
- Torus
- Dupin cyclide (inversion of a torus)
- Whitney umbrella

== Miscellaneous surfaces ==
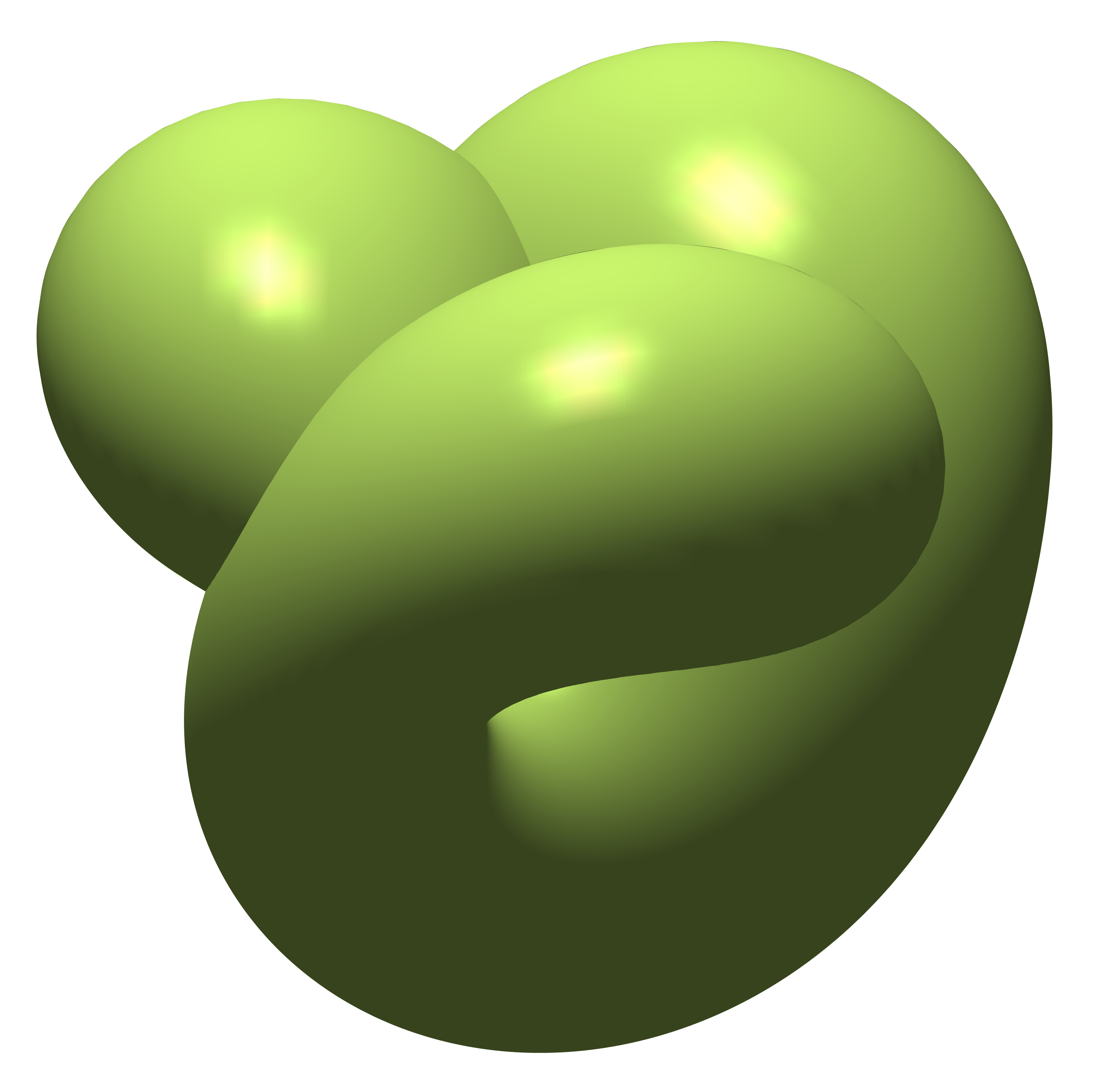
Boy's surface

- Boy's surface
- Breather surface
- Cantor tree surface
- Channel surface
- Clebsch surface
- Gaussian curvature
- Gaussian surface
- Generalized helicoid
- Homoeoid
- Jacob's ladder surface
- Kuen surface
- Klein surface
- Loch Ness monster surface
- Morin surface
- Seashell surface
- Superegg
- Supertoroid
- Wallis's conical edge
- Whitney umbrella
- Zoll surface

== See also ==
- List of curves
- Riemann surface
