= Conoid =

Ruled surface made of lines parallel to a plane and intersecting an axis

Right circular conoid: Directrix is a circle Axis is perpendicular to the directrix plane

In geometry a conoid (from Greek κωνος 'cone' and -ειδης 'similar') is a ruled surface, whose rulings (lines) fulfill the additional conditions:

(1) All rulings are parallel to a plane, the directrix plane.
(2) All rulings intersect a fixed line, the axis.

The conoid is a right conoid if its axis is perpendicular to its directrix plane. Hence all rulings are perpendicular to the axis.

Because of (1) any conoid is a Catalan surface and can be represented parametrically by

$$\mathbf x(u,v)= \mathbf c(u) + v\mathbf r(u)\$$

Any curve x(u_{0},v) with fixed parameter u = u_{0} is a ruling, c(u) describes the directrix and the vectors r(u) are all parallel to the directrix plane. The planarity of the vectors r(u) can be represented by

$$\det(\mathbf r,\mathbf \dot r,\mathbf \ddot r)=0$$.

If the directrix is a circle, the conoid is called a circular conoid.

The term conoid was already used by Archimedes in his treatise On Conoids and Spheroides.

== Examples ==
=== Right circular conoid ===
The parametric representation

$$\mathbf x(u,v)=(\cos u,\sin u,0) + v (0,-\sin u,z_0) \ ,\ 0\le u <2\pi, v\in \R$$
describes a right circular conoid with the unit circle of the x-y-plane as directrix and a directrix plane, which is parallel to the y--z-plane. Its axis is the line $(x,0,z_0) \ x\in \R \ .$

Special features:

1. The intersection with a horizontal plane is an ellipse.
2. $(1-x^2)(z-z_0)^2-y^2z_0^2=0$ is an implicit representation. Hence the right circular conoid is a surface of degree 4.
3. Kepler's rule gives for a right circular conoid with radius $r$ and height $h$ the exact volume: $V=\tfrac{\pi}{2}r^2h$.

The implicit representation is fulfilled by the points of the line $(x,0,z_0)$, too. For these points there exist no tangent planes. Such points are called singular.

=== Parabolic conoid ===
parabolic conoid: directrix is a parabola

The parametric representation

$\mathbf x(u,v)=\left(1,u,-u^2\right)+ v\left(-1,0,u^2\right)$

$$=\left(1-v,u,-(1-v)u^2\right)\ , u,v \in \R \ ,$$

describes a parabolic conoid with the equation $z=-xy^2$. The conoid has a parabola as directrix, the y-axis as axis and a plane parallel to the x-z-plane as directrix plane. It is used by architects as roof surface (s. below).

The parabolic conoid has no singular points.

=== Further examples ===
1. hyperbolic paraboloid
2. Plücker conoid
3. Whitney Umbrella
4. helicoid
hyperbolic paraboloid

Plücker conoid

Whitney umbrella

== Applications ==
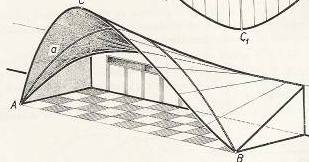
conoid in architecture

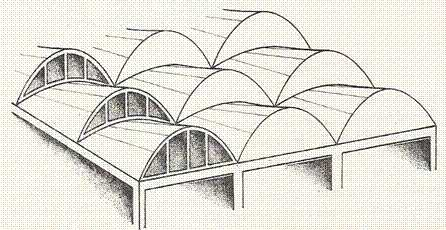
conoids in architecture

=== Mathematics ===
There are a lot of conoids with singular points, which are investigated in algebraic geometry.

=== Architecture ===
Like other ruled surfaces conoids are of high interest with architects, because they can be built using beams or bars. Right conoids can be manufactured easily: one threads bars onto an axis such that they can be rotated around this axis, only. Afterwards one deflects the bars by a directrix and generates a conoid (s. parabolic conoid).
