= Translation surface (differential geometry) =

Surface generated by translations

Translation surface: definition

In differential geometry a translation surface is a surface that is generated by translations:

- For two space curves $c_1, c_2$ with a common point $P$, the curve $c_1$ is shifted such that point $P$ is moving on $c_2$. Through this procedure, curve $c_1$ generates a surface: the translation surface.

If both curves are contained in a common plane, the translation surface is planar (part of a plane). This case is generally ignored.

elliptic paraboloid, parabolic cylinder, and hyperbolic paraboloid as translation surfaces

translation surface: the generating curves are a sine arc and a parabola arc

Shifting a horizontal circle along a helix

Simple examples:

1. Right circular cylinder: $c_1$ is a circle (or another cross section) and $c_2$ is a line.
2. The elliptic paraboloid $\; z=x^2+y^2\;$ can be generated by $\ c_1:\; (x,0,x^2)\$ and $\ c_2:\;(0,y,y^2)\$ (both curves are parabolas).
3. The hyperbolic paraboloid $z=x^2-y^2$ can be generated by $c_1: (x,0,x^2)$ (parabola) and $c_2:(0,y,-y^2)$ (downward-open parabola).

Translation surfaces are popular in descriptive geometry and architecture, because they can be modeled easily.

In differential geometry minimal surfaces are represented by translation surfaces or as midchord surfaces (s. below).

The translation surfaces as defined here should not be confused with the translation surfaces in complex geometry.

== Parametric representation ==
For two space curves $\ c_1: \; \vec x=\gamma_1(u)\$ and $\ c_2:\; \vec x=\gamma_2(v)\$ with $\gamma_1(0)=\gamma_2(0)=\vec 0$ the translation surface $\Phi$ can be represented by:

(TS) $\quad \vec x=\gamma_1(u)+\gamma_2(v) \;$

and contains the origin. Obviously this definition is symmetric regarding the curves $c_1$ and $c_2$. Therefore, both curves are called generatrices (one: generatrix). Any point $X$ of the surface is contained in a shifted copy of $c_1$ and $c_2$ resp.. The tangent plane at $X$ is generated by the tangentvectors of the generatrices at this point, if these vectors are linearly independent.

If the precondition $\gamma_1(0)=\gamma_2(0)=\vec 0$ is not fulfilled, the surface defined by (TS) may not contain the origin and the curves $c_1,c_2$. But in any case the surface contains shifted copies of any of the curves $c_1,c_2$ as parametric curves $\vec x(u_0,v)$ and $\vec x(u,v_0)$ respectively.

The two curves $c_1,c_2$ can be used to generate the so called corresponding midchord surface. Its parametric representation is

(MCS) $\quad \vec x=\frac{1}{2}(\gamma_1(u)+\gamma_2(v)) \; .$

== Helicoid as translation surface and midchord surface ==
Helicoid as translation surface with identical generatrices $c_1, c_2$

Helicoid as translation surface: any parametric curve is a shifted copy of the purple helix.

A helicoid is a special case of a generalized helicoid and a ruled surface. It is an example of a minimal surface and can be represented as a translation surface.

The helicoid with the parametric representation

$$\vec x(u,v)= (u\cos v,u\sin v, kv)$$

has a turn around shift (German: Ganghöhe) $2\pi k$. Introducing new parameters $\alpha, \varphi$ such that

$$u=2a\cos\left(\frac{\alpha-\varphi} 2 \right)\ , \ \ v=\frac{\alpha+\varphi}{2}$$

and $a$ a positive real number, one gets a new parametric representation

- $\vec X(\alpha,\varphi)= \left (a\cos\alpha + a\cos \varphi \; ,\; a\sin\alpha + a\sin \varphi\; ,\; \frac{k\alpha}{2}+\frac{k\varphi}{2}\right )$

$$=(a\cos\alpha , a\sin\alpha , \frac{k\alpha}{2} ) \ +\ (a\cos\varphi , a\sin\varphi ,\frac{k\varphi}{2} )\ ,$$

which is the parametric representation of a translation surface with the two identical (!) generatrices

$c_1: \; \gamma_1=\vec X(\alpha,0)=\left(a+a\cos\alpha , a\sin\alpha , \frac{k\alpha}{2} \right) \quad$ and
$$c_2: \; \gamma_2=\vec X(0,\varphi)=\left(a+a\cos\varphi , a\sin\varphi ,\frac{k\varphi}{2} \right)\ .$$

The common point used for the diagram is $P=\vec X(0,0)=(2a,0,0)$. The (identical) generatrices are helices with the turn around shift $k\pi\;,$ which lie on the cylinder with the equation $(x-a)^2+y^2=a^2$. Any parametric curve is a shifted copy of the generatrix $c_1$ (in diagram: purple) and is contained in the right circular cylinder with radius $a$, which contains the z-axis.

The new parametric representation represents only such points of the helicoid that are within the cylinder with the equation $x^2+y^2=4a^2$.

Helicoid as midchord surface of two identical generatrices (green helix).

From the new parametric representation one recognizes, that the helicoid is a midchord surface, too:

$$\begin{align}
\vec X(\alpha,\varphi) & = \left(a\cos\alpha , a\sin\alpha , \frac{k\alpha}{2} \right) \ +\ \left(a\cos\varphi , a\sin\varphi ,\frac{k\varphi}{2} \right) \\[5pt]
& =\frac{1}{2}(\delta_1(\alpha) +\delta_2(\varphi))\ ,\quad
\end{align}$$

where

$d_1: \ \vec x=\delta_1(\alpha)=(2a\cos\alpha , 2a\sin\alpha , k\alpha ) \ ,\quad$ and
$$d_2: \ \vec x=\delta_2(\varphi)=(2a\cos\varphi , 2a\sin\varphi , k\varphi ) \ ,\quad$$

are two identical generatrices.

In diagram: $P_1: \delta_1(\alpha_0)$ lies on the helix $d_1$ and $P_2: \delta_2(\varphi_0)$ on the (identical) helix $d_2$. The midpoint of the chord is $\ M: \frac{1}{2}(\delta_1(\alpha_0) +\delta_2(\varphi_0))=\vec X(\alpha_0,\varphi_0)\$.

== Advantages of a translation surface ==
Architecture

A surface (for example a roof) can be manufactured using a jig for curve $c_2$ and several identical jigs of curve $c_1$. The jigs can be designed without any knowledge of mathematics. By positioning the jigs the rules of a translation surface have to be respected only.

Descriptive geometry

To establish a parallel projection of a translation surface, one must 1) produce projections of the two generatrices, 2) make a jig of curve $c_1$, and 3) draw with help of this jig copies of the curve respecting the rules of a translation surface. The contour of the surface is the envelope of the curves drawn with the jig. This procedure works for orthogonal and oblique projections, but not for central projections.

Differential geometry

For a translation surface with parametric representation $\vec x(u,v)=\gamma_1(u)+\gamma_2(v) \;$ the partial derivatives of $\vec x(u,v)$ are simple derivatives of the curves. Hence the mixed derivatives are always $0$ and the coefficient $M$ of the second fundamental form is $0$, too. This is an essential facilitation for showing that (for example) a helicoid is a minimal surface.

== See also ==
- Surface of revolution (one curve is a circle)
- Channel surface (one curve is replaced by a sphere)
- Freeform surface modelling (one can translate a curve to generate a surface)
