= Cylindroid =

Cylindroid may refer to:

- Elliptic cylinder, a cylinder with an ellipse as its cross-section
- An adjectival form of Cylinder (geometry), regardless of cross-section
- Plücker's conoid, a self-intersecting ruled surface whose cross-sections are pairs of crossing lines
