= Cuspidal point =

Cuspidal point can refer to:

- Cuspidal point of a curve, see Cusp (singularity)
- Cuspidal point of a surface, see Pinch point (mathematics)
