= Tangent developable =

Surface swept by tangents to a curve

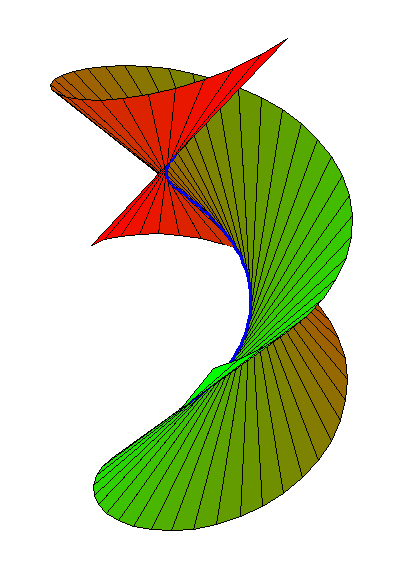
The tangent developable of a helix

In the mathematical study of the differential geometry of surfaces, a tangent developable is a particular kind of developable surface obtained from a curve in Euclidean space as the surface swept out by the tangent lines to the curve. Such a surface is also the envelope of the tangent planes to the curve.

== Parameterization ==
Let $\gamma(t)$ be a parameterization of a smooth space curve. That is, $\gamma$ is a twice-differentiable function with nowhere-vanishing derivative that maps its argument $t$ (a real number) to a point in space; the curve is the image of $\gamma$. Then a two-dimensional surface, the tangent developable of $\gamma$, may be parameterized by the map

$(s,t)\mapsto \gamma(t) + s\gamma{\,'}(t).$

The original curve forms a boundary of the tangent developable, and is called its directrix or edge of regression. This curve is obtained by first developing the surface into the plane, and then considering the image in the plane of the generators of the ruling on the surface. The envelope of this family of lines is a plane curve whose inverse image under the development is the edge of regression. Intuitively, it is a curve along which the surface needs to be folded during the process of developing into the plane.

== Properties ==
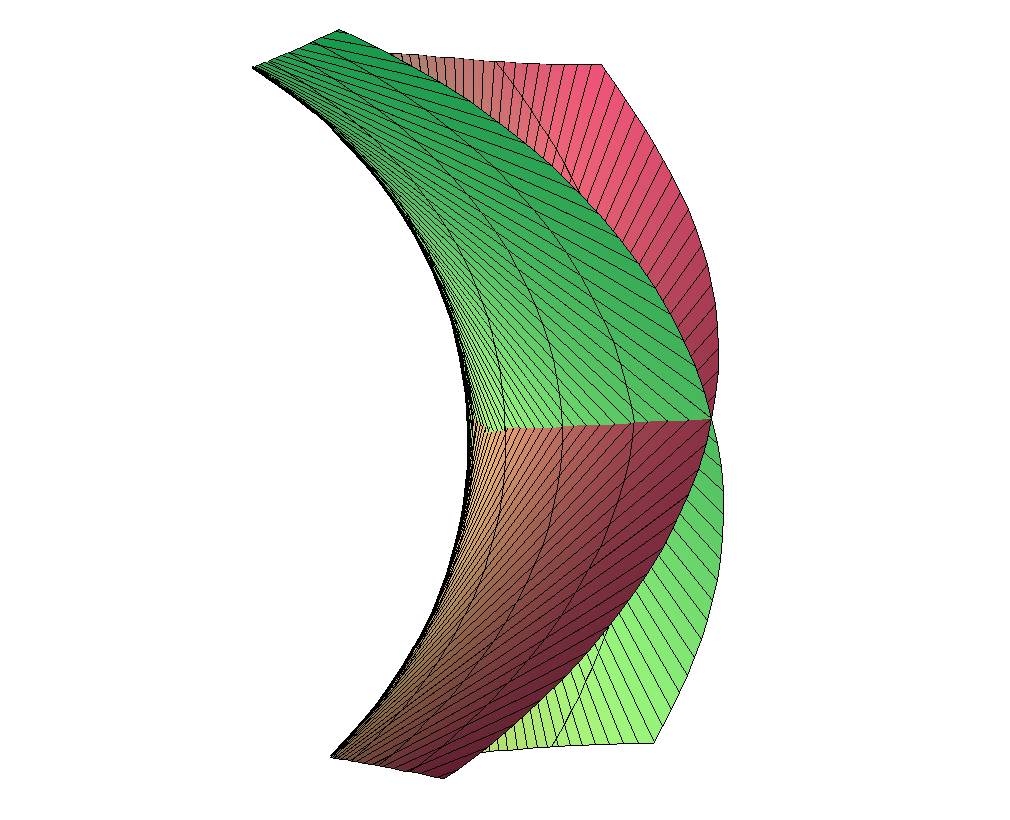
Tangent developable of a curve with a point of zero torsion.

The tangent developable is a developable surface; that is, it is a surface with zero Gaussian curvature. It is one of three fundamental types of developable surface; the other two are the generalized cones (the surface traced out by a one-dimensional family of lines through a fixed point), and the cylinders (surfaces traced out by a one-dimensional family of parallel lines). (The plane is sometimes given as a fourth type, or may be seen as a special case of either of these two types.) Every developable surface in three-dimensional space may be formed by gluing together pieces of these three types; it follows from this that every developable surface is a ruled surface, a union of a one-dimensional family of lines. However, not every ruled surface is developable; the helicoid provides a counterexample.

Generically, if a curve has a point of zero torsion, its tangent developable at that point has a pinch-shaped self-intersection shaped like a Whitney umbrella. To show this, use the curve $t \mapsto (t, t^2, t^4)$ and study its tangent developable near $t = 0$.

== History ==
Tangent developables were first studied by Leonhard Euler in 1772. Until that time, the only known developable surfaces were the generalized cones and the cylinders. Euler showed that tangent developables are developable and that every developable surface is of one of these types.
