= Wallis's conical edge =

Right conoid ruled surface

In geometry, Wallis's conical edge is a ruled surface given by the parametric equations

$$x=v\cos u,\quad y=v\sin u,\quad z=c\sqrt{a^2-b^2\cos^2u}$$

where a, b and c are constants.

Wallis's conical edge is also a kind of right conoid. It is named after the English mathematician John Wallis, who was one of the first to use Cartesian methods to study conic sections.

Figure 2. Wallis's Conical Edge with a = 1.01, b = c = 1

Figure 1. Wallis's Conical Edge with a = b = c = 1

== See also ==
- Plücker's conoid
- Ruled surface
- Right conoid
