= Right conoid =

Ruled surface made of lines orthogonal to an axis

A right conoid as a ruled surface.

In geometry, a right conoid is a ruled surface generated by a family of straight lines that all intersect perpendicularly to a fixed straight line, called the axis of the right conoid.

Using a Cartesian coordinate system in three-dimensional space, if we take the z-axis to be the axis of a right conoid, then the right conoid can be represented by the parametric equations:

$$x=v\cos u$$
$$y=v\sin u$$
$$z=h(u)$$

where h(u) is some function for representing the height of the moving line.

== Examples ==
Generation of a typical right conoid

A typical example of right conoids is given by the parametric equations

$$x=v\cos u, y=v\sin u, z=2\sin u$$

The image on the right shows how the coplanar lines generate the right conoid.

Other right conoids include:

- Helicoid: $x=v\cos u, y=v\sin u, z=cu.$
- Whitney umbrella: $x=vu, y=v, z=u^2.$
- Wallis's conical edge: $x=v\cos u, y=v \sin u, z=c\sqrt{a^2-b^2\cos^2u}.$
- Plücker's conoid: $x=v\cos u, y=v\sin u, z=c\sin nu.$
- hyperbolic paraboloid: $x=v, y=u, z=uv$ (with x-axis and y-axis as its axes).

== See also ==
- Conoid
- Helicoid
- Whitney umbrella
- Ruled surface
