= Catalan surface =

Mathematical concept

A Catalan surface.

In geometry, a Catalan surface, named after the Belgian mathematician Eugène Charles Catalan, is a ruled surface all of whose generators are parallel to a fixed plane.

== Equations ==
The vector equation of a Catalan surface is given by

r = s(u) + v L(u),

where r = s(u) is the space curve and L(u) is the unit vector of the ruling at u = u. All the vectors L(u) are parallel to the same plane, called the directrix plane of the surface. This can be characterized by the condition: the mixed product [L(u), L' (u), L" (u)] = 0.

The parametric equations of the Catalan surface are

$x=f(u)+vi(u),\quad y=g(u)+vj(u),\quad z=h(u)+vk(u) \,$

== Special cases ==
If all the generators of a Catalan surface intersect a fixed line, then the surface is called a conoid.

Catalan proved that the helicoid and the plane were the only ruled minimal surfaces.

== See also ==
- Generalized helicoid
