= On Conoids and Spheroids =

Work by Archimedes

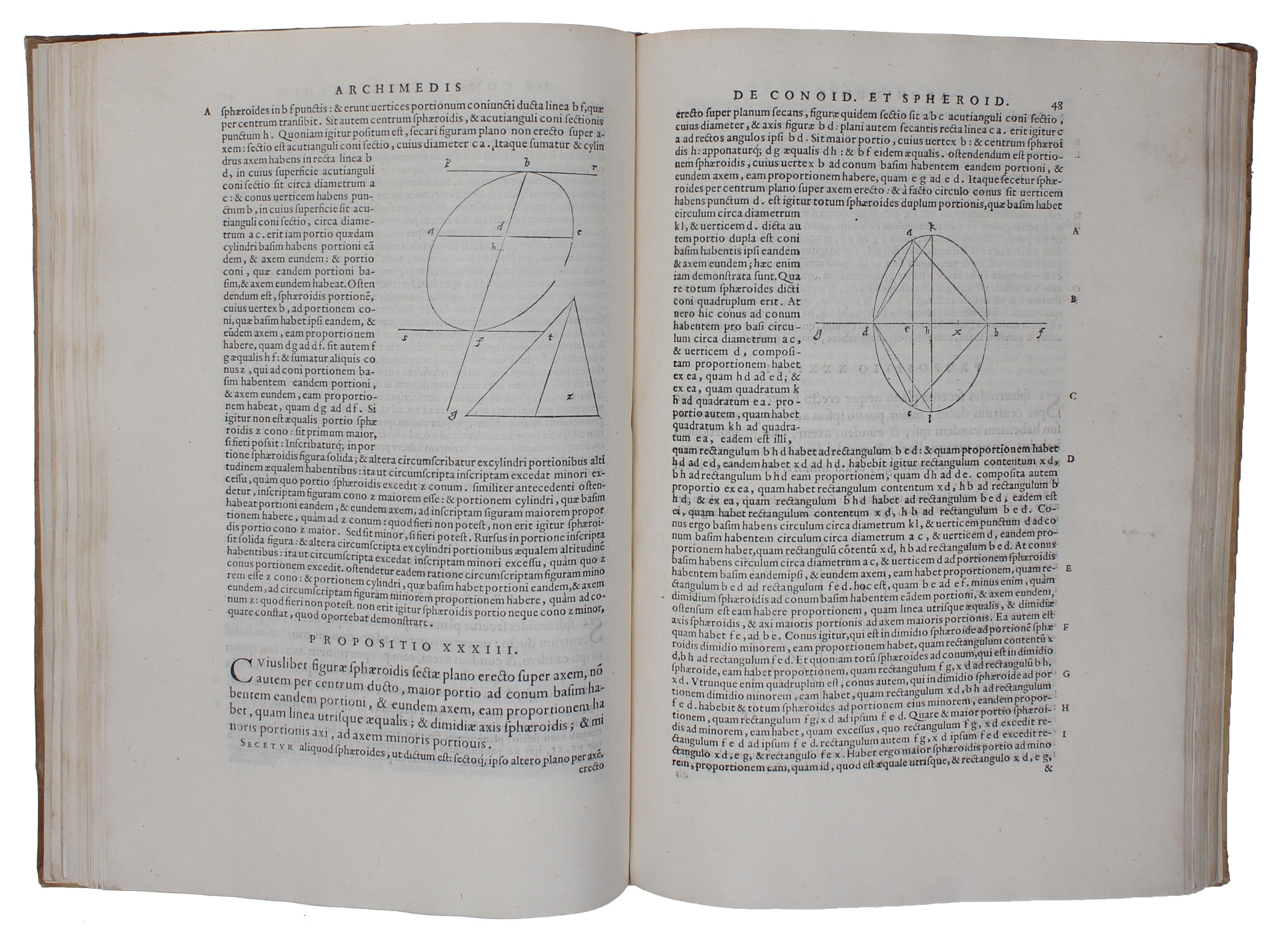
A page from Archimedes' On Conoids and Spheroids

On Conoids and Spheroids (Ancient Greek: Περὶ κωνοειδέων καὶ σφαιροειδέων) is a surviving work by the Greek mathematician and engineer Archimedes (c. 287 BC – c. 212 BC). Consisting of 32 propositions, the work explores properties of and theorems related to the solids generated by revolution of conic sections about their axes, including paraboloids, hyperboloids, and spheroids. The principal result of the work is comparing the volume of any segment cut off by a plane with the volume of a cone with equal base and axis.

The work is addressed to Dositheus of Pelusium.
