= Plücker's conoid =

Right conoid ruled surface

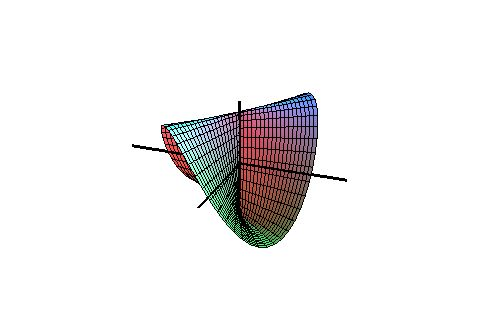
Figure 1. Plücker's conoid with n = 2.

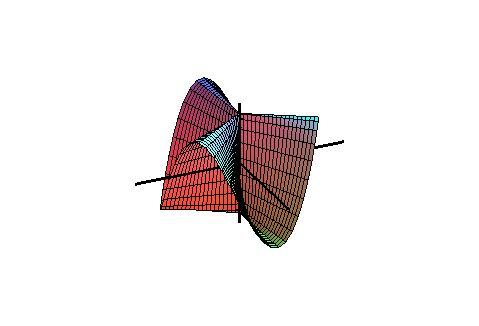
Figure 2. Plücker's conoid with n = 3.

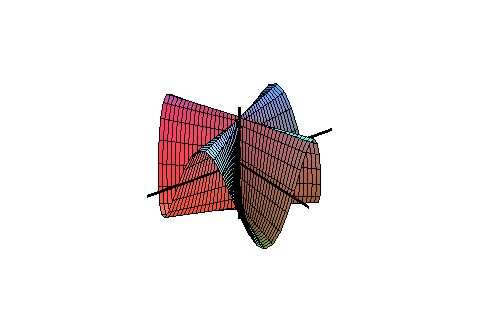
Figure 3. Plücker's conoid with n = 4.

In geometry, Plücker's conoid is a ruled surface named after the German mathematician Julius Plücker. It is also called a conical wedge or cylindroid; however, the latter name is ambiguous, as "cylindroid" may also refer to an elliptic cylinder.

Plücker's conoid is the surface defined by the function of two variables:

$$z=\frac{2xy}{x^2+y^2}.$$

This function has an essential singularity at the origin.

By using cylindrical coordinates in space, we can write the above function into parametric equations

$$x=v\cos u,\quad y=v\sin u,\quad z=\sin 2u.$$

Thus Plücker's conoid is a right conoid, which can be obtained by rotating a horizontal line about the z-axis with the oscillatory motion (with period 2π) along the segment [–1, 1] of the axis (Figure 4).

A generalization of Plücker's conoid is given by the parametric equations

$$x=v \cos u,\quad y=v \sin u,\quad z= \sin nu.$$

where n denotes the number of folds in the surface. The difference is that the period of the oscillatory motion along the z-axis is 2π/n. (Figure 5 for n = 3)

Figure 4. Plücker's conoid with n = 2.

Figure 5. Plücker's conoid with n = 3

Animation of Plucker's conoid with n = 2

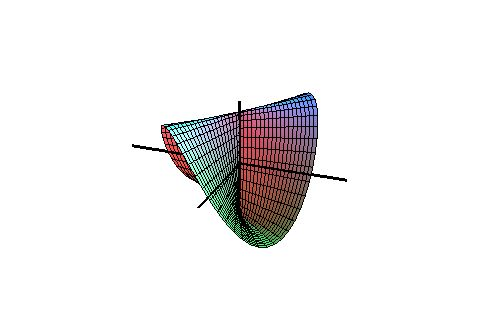
Plucker's conoid with n = 2

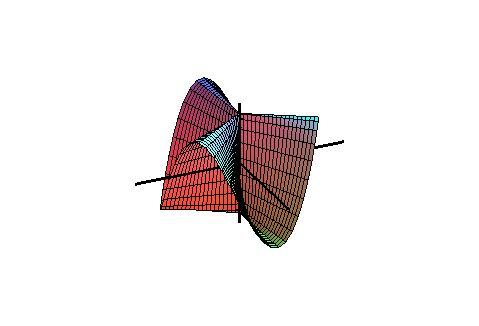
Plucker's conoid with n = 3

Animation of Plucker's conoid with n = 2

Animation of Plucker's conoid with n = 3

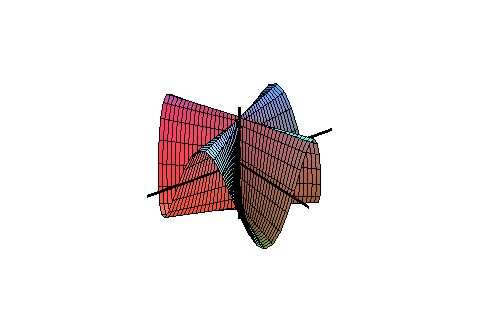
Plucker's conoid with n = 4

== See also ==
- Ruled surface
- Right conoid
- Wallis's conical edge
