= Pseudosphere =

Geometric surface

In geometry, a pseudosphere is a surface in $\mathbb{R}^3$. It is the most famous example of a pseudospherical surface. A pseudospherical surface is a surface piecewise smoothly immersed in $\mathbb{R}^3$ with constant negative Gaussian curvature. A "pseudospherical surface of radius R" is a surface in $\mathbb{R}^3$ having curvature −1/R^{2} at each point. Its name comes from the analogy with the sphere of radius R, which is a surface of curvature 1/R^{2}. Examples include the tractroid, Dini's surfaces, breather surfaces, and the Kuen surface.

The term "pseudosphere" was introduced by Eugenio Beltrami in his 1868 paper on models of hyperbolic geometry.

== Tractroid ==
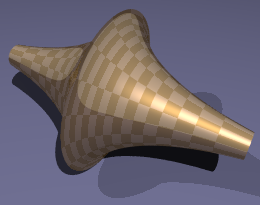
Tractroid

By "the pseudosphere", people usually mean the tractroid. The tractroid is obtained by revolving a tractrix about its asymptote. As an example, the (half) pseudosphere (with radius 1) is the surface of revolution of the tractrix parametrized by

$$t \mapsto \left( t - \tanh t, \operatorname{sech}\,t \right), \quad \quad 0 \le t < \infty.$$

It is a singular space (the equator is a singularity), but away from the singularities, it has constant negative Gaussian curvature and therefore is locally isometric to a hyperbolic plane.

The name "pseudosphere" comes about because it has a two-dimensional surface of constant negative Gaussian curvature, just as a sphere has a surface with constant positive Gaussian curvature. Just as the sphere has at every point a positively curved geometry of a dome the whole pseudosphere has at every point the negatively curved geometry of a saddle.

As early as 1693 Christiaan Huygens found that the volume and the surface area of the pseudosphere are finite, despite the infinite extent of the shape along the axis of rotation. For a given edge radius R, the area is 4πR^{2} just as it is for the sphere, while the volume is 2/3πR^{3} and therefore half that of a sphere of that radius.

The pseudosphere is an important geometric precursor to mathematical fabric arts and pedagogy.

== Line congruence ==
A line congruence is a 2-parameter families of lines in $\R^3$. It can be written as
$$X(u, v, t)=x(u, v)+t p(u, v)$$
where each pick of $u, v \in \R$ picks a specific line in the family.

A focal surface of the line congruence is a surface that is tangent to the line congruence. At each point on the surface,
$$\det\left(\partial_u X, \partial_v X, p\right)=0$$
The above equation expands to a quadratic equation in $t$:
$$\det (\partial_u x(u, v)+ t\partial_u p(u, v), \partial_v x(u, v)+ t\partial_v p(u, v), p(u, v)) = 0$$
Thus, for each $(u, v) \in \R^2$, there in general exists two choices of $t_1(u, v), t_2(u, v)$. Thus a generic line congruence has exactly two focal surfaces parameterized by $t_1(u, v), t_2(u, v)$.

For a bundle of lines normal to a smooth surface, the two focal surfaces correspond to its evolutes: the loci of centers of principal curvature.

In 1879, Bianchi proved that if a line congruence is such that the corresponding points on the two focal surfaces are at a constant distance 1, that is, $|t_1(u, v) - t_2(u, v)| = 1$, then both of the focal surfaces have constant curvature -1.

In 1880, Lie proved a partial converse. Let $X$ be a pseudospherical surface. Then there exists a second pseudospherical surface $\hat{X}$ and a line congruence $\mathcal{L}$ such that $X$ and $\hat{X}$ are the focal surfaces of $\mathcal{L}$. Furthermore, $\hat{X}$ and $\mathcal{L}$ may be constructed from $X$ by integrating a sequence of ODEs.

== Universal covering space ==
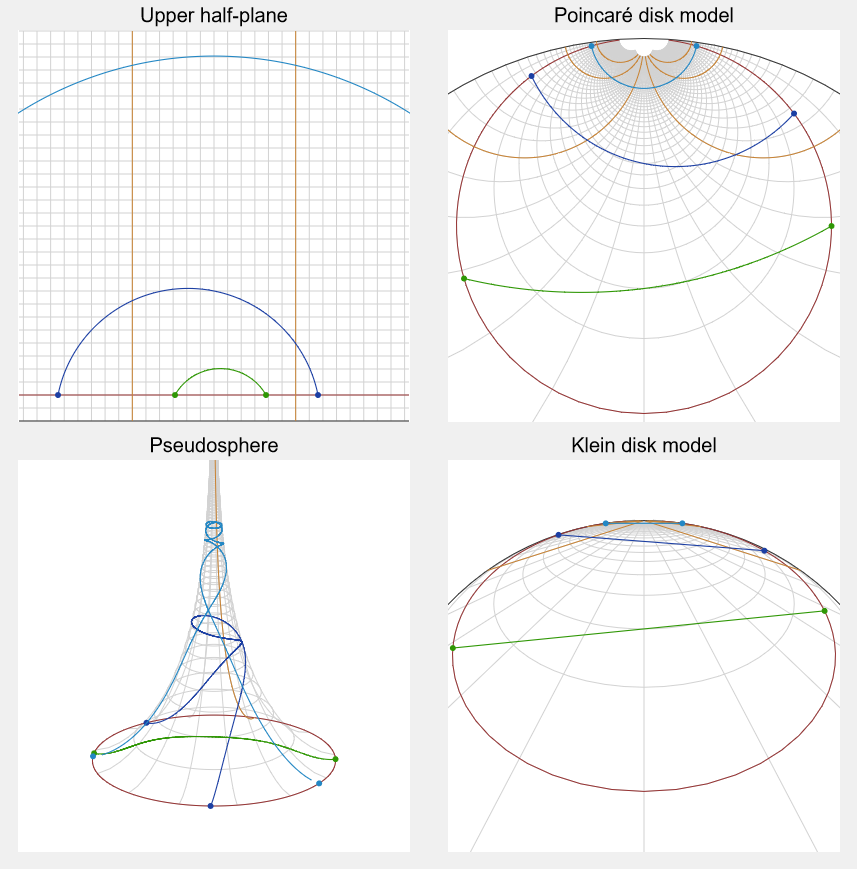
The pseudosphere and its relation to three other models of hyperbolic geometry

The half pseudosphere of curvature −1 is covered by the interior of a horocycle. In the Poincaré half-plane model one convenient choice is the portion of the half-plane with y ≥ 1. Then the covering map is periodic in the x direction of period 2π, and takes the horocycles y = c to the meridians of the pseudosphere and the vertical geodesics x = c to the tractrices that generate the pseudosphere. This mapping is a local isometry, and thus exhibits the portion y ≥ 1 of the upper half-plane as the universal covering space of the pseudosphere. The precise mapping is

$$(x,y)\mapsto \big(v(\operatorname{arcosh} y)\cos x, v(\operatorname{arcosh} y) \sin x, u(\operatorname{arcosh} y)\big) ,$$

where

$$t\mapsto \big(u(t) = t - \operatorname{tanh} t,v(t) =  \operatorname{sech} t\big)$$

is the parametrization of the tractrix above.

== Hyperboloid ==
Deforming the pseudosphere to a portion of Dini's surface. In differential geometry, this is a Lie transformation. In the corresponding solutions to the sine-Gordon equation, this deformation corresponds to a Lorentz Boost of the static 1-soliton solution.

In some sources that use the hyperboloid model of the hyperbolic plane, the hyperboloid is referred to as a pseudosphere. This usage of the word is because the hyperboloid can be thought of as a sphere of imaginary radius, embedded in a Minkowski space.

== Relation to solutions to the sine-Gordon equation ==
Pseudospherical surfaces can be constructed from solutions to the sine-Gordon equation. A sketch proof starts with reparametrizing the tractroid with coordinates in which the Gauss–Codazzi equations can be rewritten as the sine-Gordon equation.

On a surface, at each point, draw a cross, pointing at the two directions of principal curvature. These crosses can be integrated into two families of curves, making up a coordinate system on the surface. Let the coordinate system be written as $(x, y)$.

At each point on a pseudospherical surface there in general exists two asymptotic directions. Along them, the curvature is zero. Let the angle between the asymptotic directions be $\theta$.

A theorem states that
$$\partial_{xx} \theta - \partial_{yy} \theta = \sin\theta$$
In particular, for the tractroid the Gauss–Codazzi equations are the sine-Gordon equation applied to the static soliton solution, so the Gauss–Codazzi equations are satisfied. In these coordinates the first and second fundamental forms are written in a way that makes clear the Gaussian curvature is −1 for any solution of the sine-Gordon equations.

Then any solution to the sine-Gordon equation can be used to specify a first and second fundamental form which satisfy the Gauss–Codazzi equations. There is then a theorem that any such set of initial data can be used to at least locally specify an immersed surface in $\mathbb{R}^3$.

This connection between sine-Gordon equations and pseudospherical surfaces mean that one can identify solutions to the equation with surfaces. Then, any way to generate new sine-Gordon solutions from old automatically generates new pseudospherical surfaces from old, and vice versa.

A few examples of sine-Gordon solutions and their corresponding surface are given as follows:

- Static 1-soliton: pseudosphere
- Moving 1-soliton: Dini's surface
- Breather solution: Breather surface
- 2-soliton: Kuen surface

== See also ==
- Hilbert's theorem (differential geometry)
- Dini's surface
- Gabriel's Horn
- Hyperboloid
- Hyperboloid structure
- Quasi-sphere
- Sine–Gordon equation
- Sphere
- Surface of revolution
