= Kuen surface =

Mathematical surface of constant unit negative Gaussian curvature

The Kuen surface is a mathematical surface of constant negative unit Gaussian curvature, making it an example of a pseudospherical surface. It can be described as a parametric surface in terms of the parametric equations

$$x = 2 \cosh v \, (\cos u + u \sin u) / w$$
$$y = 2 \cosh v \, ( \sin u - u \cos u ) / w$$
$$z = v - (2 \sinh v \cosh v ) / w$$

where

$$w = (\cosh v)^2 + u^2$$

It is named after, and was first described by, the German mathematician Theodor Kuen in 1884. The surface is a special case of the class of Enneper surfaces, first described by Alfred Enneper.

The Kuen surface was of interest to surrealist artists, including Max Ernst and Man Ray. The surface has also inspired work by the Japanese sculptor Toshimasa Kikuchi.

== See also ==
- Dini's surface
- Breather surface
