= Breather surface =

Surface of constant negative curvature

In differential geometry, a breather surface is a one-parameter family of mathematical surfaces which correspond to breather solutions of the sine-Gordon equation, a differential equation appearing in theoretical physics. The surfaces have the remarkable property that they have constant curvature $-1$, where the curvature is well-defined. This makes them examples of generalized pseudospheres.

== Mathematical background ==
Sine-Gordon standing breather is a swinging in time coupled kink-antikink 2-soliton solution.

There is a correspondence between embedded surfaces of constant curvature -1, known as pseudospheres, and solutions to the sine-Gordon equation. This correspondence can be built starting with the simplest example of a pseudosphere, the tractroid. In a special set of coordinates, known as asymptotic coordinates, the Gauss–Codazzi equations, which are consistency equations dictating when a surface of prescribed first and second fundamental form can be embedded into three-dimensional space with the flat metric, reduce to the sine-Gordon equation.

In the correspondence, the tractroid corresponds to the static 1-soliton solution of the sine-Gordon solution. Due to the Lorentz invariance of sine-Gordon, a one-parameter family of Lorentz boosts can be applied to the static solution to obtain new solutions: on the pseudosphere side, these are known as Lie transformations, which deform the tractroid to the one-parameter family of surfaces known as Dini's surfaces.

The method of Bäcklund transformation allows the construction of a large number of distinct solutions to the sine-Gordon equation, the multi-soliton solutions. For example, the 2-soliton corresponds to the Kuen surface. However, while this generates an infinite family of solutions, the breather solutions are not among them.

Breather solutions are instead derived from the inverse scattering method for the sine-Gordon equation. They are localized in space but oscillate in time.

Each solution to the sine-Gordon equation gives a first and second fundamental form which satisfy the Gauss-Codazzi equations. The fundamental theorem of surface theory then guarantees that there is a parameterized surface which recovers the prescribed first and second fundamental forms. Locally the parameterization is well-behaved, but extended arbitrarily the resulting surface may have self-intersections and cusps. Indeed, a theorem of Hilbert says that any pseudosphere cannot be embedded regularly (roughly, meaning without cusps) into $\mathbb{R}^3$.

== Parameterization ==
The parameterization $\sigma: \mathbb{R}^2 \rightarrow \mathbb{R}^3; (u,v) \mapsto (x,y,z)$ with parameter $0 < a < 1$ is given by

$$\begin{align}
x & {} = -u+\frac{2\left(1-a^2\right)\cosh(au)\sinh(au)}w \\  \\
y & {} = \frac{2\sqrt{1-a^2}\cosh(au)\left(-\sqrt{1-a^2}\cos(v)\cos\left(\sqrt{1-a^2}v\right)-\sin(v)\sin\left(\sqrt{1-a^2}v\right)\right)}w \\  \\
z & {} = \frac{2\sqrt{1-a^2}\cosh(au)\left(-\sqrt{1-a^2}\sin(v)\cos\left(\sqrt{1-a^2}v\right)+\cos(v)\sin\left(\sqrt{1-a^2}v\right)\right)}w
\end{align}$$

where

$$w = {a\left(\left(1-a^2\right)\cosh^2(au)+a^2\,\sin^2\left(\sqrt{1-a^2}v\right)\right)}$$

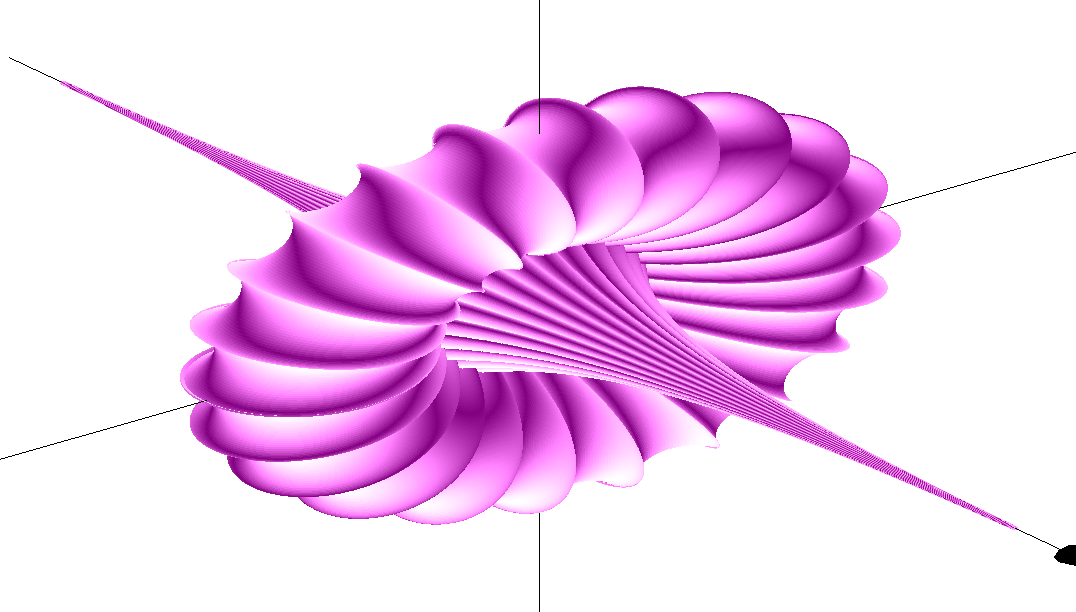
Breather surface when $a=\frac{2}{5}\text{ and }-14\le u<14$$\text{ and }-37.4\le v<37.4$

== See also ==
- Dini's surface
- Kuen surface
