= Dini's surface =

Geometric surface

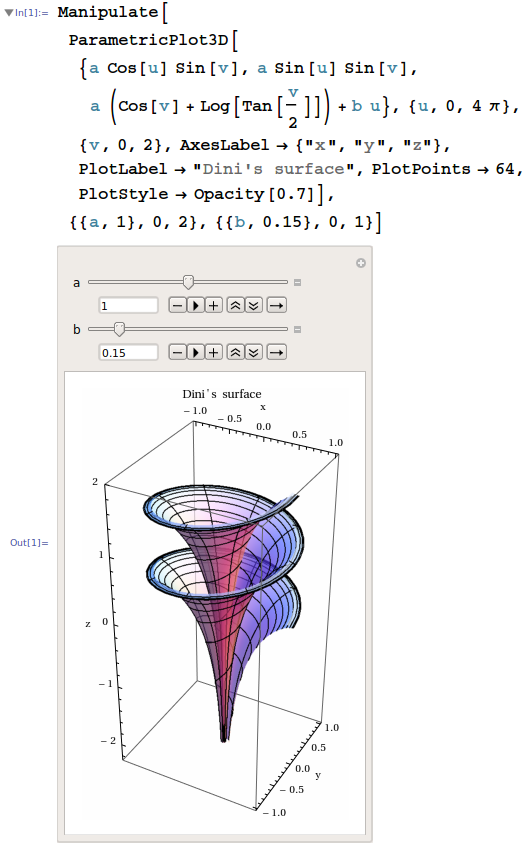
Dini's surface plotted with adjustable parameters by Wolfram Mathematica program

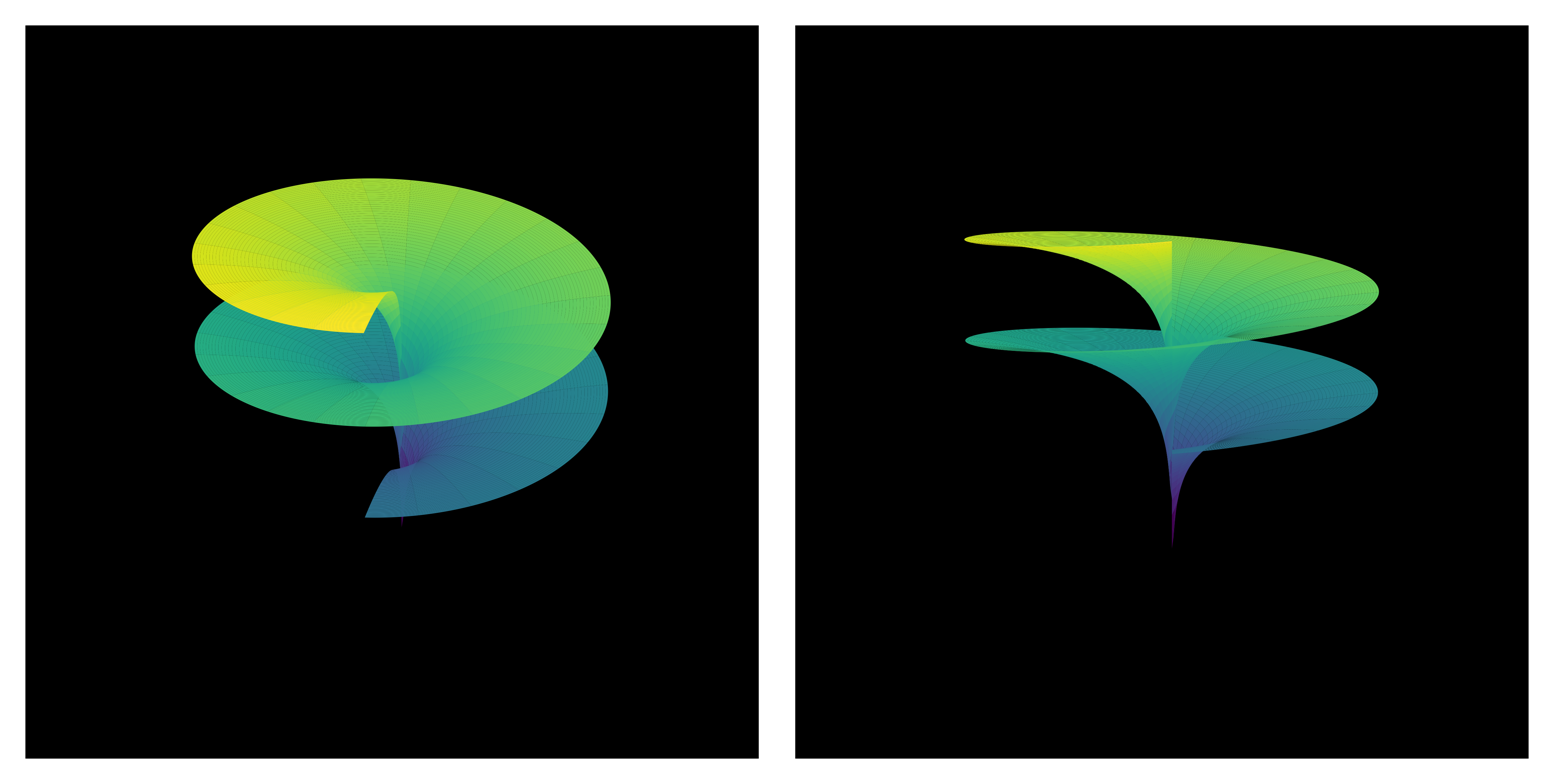
Dini's Surface with constants a = 1, b = 0.5 and 0 ≤ u ≤ 4π and 0<v<1.

In geometry, Dini's surface is a surface with constant negative curvature that can be created by twisting a pseudosphere. It is named after Ulisse Dini and described by the following parametric equations:

$$\begin{align}
x&=a \cos u \sin v \\
y&=a \sin u \sin v \\
z&=a \left(\cos v +\ln \tan \frac{v}{2} \right) + bu
\end{align}$$

Dini's surface with 0 ≤ u ≤ 4π and 0.01 ≤ v ≤ 1 and constants a = 1.0 and b = 0.2.

Another description is a generalized helicoid constructed from the tractrix.

== See also ==
- Breather surface
- Kuen surface
