= Generalized helicoid =

Euclidean space surface

generalized helicoid: meridian is a parabola.

In geometry, a generalized helicoid is a surface in Euclidean space generated by rotating and simultaneously displacing a curve, the profile curve, along a line, its axis. Any point of the given curve is the starting point of a circular helix. If the profile curve is contained in a plane through the axis, it is called the meridian of the generalized helicoid. Simple examples of generalized helicoids are the helicoids. The meridian of a helicoid is a line which intersects the axis orthogonally.

Essential types of generalized helicoids are

- ruled generalized helicoids. Their profile curves are lines and the surfaces are ruled surfaces.
- circular generalized helicoids. Their profile curves are circles.

In mathematics helicoids play an essential role as minimal surfaces. In the technical area generalized helicoids are used for staircases, slides, screws, and pipes.

== Analytical representation ==
screw motion of a point green: pitch, blue: screw axis

=== Screw motion of a point ===
Moving a point on a screwtype curve means, the point is rotated and displaced along a line (axis) such that the displacement is proportional to the rotation-angle. The result is a circular helix.

If the axis is the z-axis, the motion of a point $P_0=(x_0,y_0,z_0)$ can be described parametrically by

$$\mathbf p(\varphi)=
\begin{pmatrix}
x_0\cos \varphi -y_0\sin\varphi\\
x_0\sin \varphi +y_0 \cos \varphi\\
z_0 + c\; \varphi
\end{pmatrix} \ , \ \varphi \in \R \ .$$

$c\ne 0$ is called slant, the angle $\varphi$, measured in radian, is called the screw angle and $h=c\;2\pi$ the pitch (green). The trace of the point is a circular helix (red). It is contained in the surface of a right circular cylinder. Its radius is the distance of point $P_0$ to the z-axis.

In case of $c>0$, the helix is called right handed; otherwise, it is said to be left handed. (In case of $c=0$ the motion is a rotation around the z-axis.)

=== Screw motion of a curve ===
The screw motion of curve

$$\mathbf x(t)= (x(t),y(t),z(t))^T, \ t_1\le t\le t_2 \ ,$$

yields a generalized helicoid with the parametric representation

- $$\mathbf S(t,\varphi)=
\begin{pmatrix}
x(t)\cos \varphi -y(t)\sin\varphi\\
x(t)\sin \varphi +y(t) \cos \varphi\\
z(t)+c\;\varphi
\end{pmatrix}\ ,\quad t_1\le t\le t_2, \ \varphi \in \R \ .$$

The curves $\mathbf S(t=\text{constant},\varphi)$ are circular helices.
The curves $\mathbf S(t,\varphi=\text{constant})$ are copies of the given profile curve.

Example: For the first picture above, the meridian is a parabola.

== Ruled generalized helicoids ==
right ruled generalized helicoid: closed (left) and open (right)

oblique types: closed (left) and open (right)

tangent developable type: definition (left) and example

=== Types ===
If the profile curve is a line one gets a ruled generalized helicoid. There are four types:

(1) The line intersects the axis orthogonally. One gets a helicoid (closed right ruled generalized helicoid).
(2) The line intersects the axis, but not orthogonally. One gets an oblique closed type.

If the given line and the axis are skew lines one gets an open type and the axis is not part of the surface (s. picture).

(3) If the given line and the axis are skew lines and the line is contained in a plane orthogonally to the axis one gets a right open type or shortly open helicoid.
(4) If the line and the axis are skew and the line is not contained in ... (s. 3) one gets an oblique open type.

Oblique types do intersect themselves (s. picture), right types (helicoids) do not.

One gets an interesting case, if the line is skew to the axis and the product of its distance $d$ to the axis and its slope is exactly $c$. In this case the surface is a tangent developable surface and is generated by the directrix $(d\cos \varphi,d\sin\varphi,c\varphi)$.

Remark:

1. The (open and closed) helicoids are Catalan surfaces. The closed type (common helicoid) is even a conoid
2. Ruled generalized helicoids are not algebraic surfaces.

=== On closed ruled generalized helicoids ===
on the selfintersection of closed ruled generalized helicoids

A closed ruled generalized helicoid has a profile line that intersects the axis. If the profile line is described by $(t,0,z_0+m\;t)^T$ one gets the following parametric representation

- $$\mathbf S(t,\varphi)=\begin{pmatrix}
t\cos \varphi\\
t\sin \varphi\\
z_0+mt+c\varphi
\end{pmatrix}\ .$$

If $m=0$ (common helicoid) the surface does not intersect itself.
If $m\ne0$ (oblique type) the surface intersects itself and the curves (on the surface)

$\mathbf S(t_i,\varphi)$ with $t_i=\frac{h}{4m}(2i+1), \ i=1,2,\ldots$

consist of double points. There exist infinite double curves. The smaller $|m|$ the greater are the distances between the double curves.

=== On the tangent developable type ===
tangent developable: regular parts (green and blue) and the directrix (purple)

For the directrix (a helix)

$$\mathbf x(\varphi)=(r\cos \varphi,r\sin \varphi,c\varphi)^T$$

one gets the following parametric representation of the tangent developable surface:

- $$\mathbf S(t,\varphi)=\mathbf x(\varphi)+t\mathbf \dot x(\varphi)=
\begin{pmatrix}
r\cos \varphi-tr\sin\varphi\\
r\sin \varphi+tr\cos\varphi\\
c(t+\varphi)
\end{pmatrix}\ .$$

The surface normal vector is

$$\mathbf n =\mathbf S_t\times\mathbf S_\varphi=\mathbf \dot x\times(\mathbf \dot x+t\mathbf \ddot x)=t(\mathbf \dot x\times\mathbf \ddot x)=t
\begin{pmatrix}
cr\sin\varphi\\
-cr\cos\varphi\\
r^2
\end{pmatrix}\ .$$

For $t=0$ the normal vector is the null vector. Hence the directrix consists of singular points. The directrix separates two regular parts of the surface (s. picture).

== Circular generalized helicoids ==
meridian is a circle

profile curve is a horizontal circle

There are 3 interesting types of circular generalized helicoids:

(1) If the circle is a meridian and does not intersect the axis (s. picture).
(2) The plane that contains the circle is orthogonal to the helix of the circle centers. One gets a pipe surface
(3) The circle's plane is orthogonal to the axis and comprises the axis point in it (s. picture). This type was used for baroque-columns.

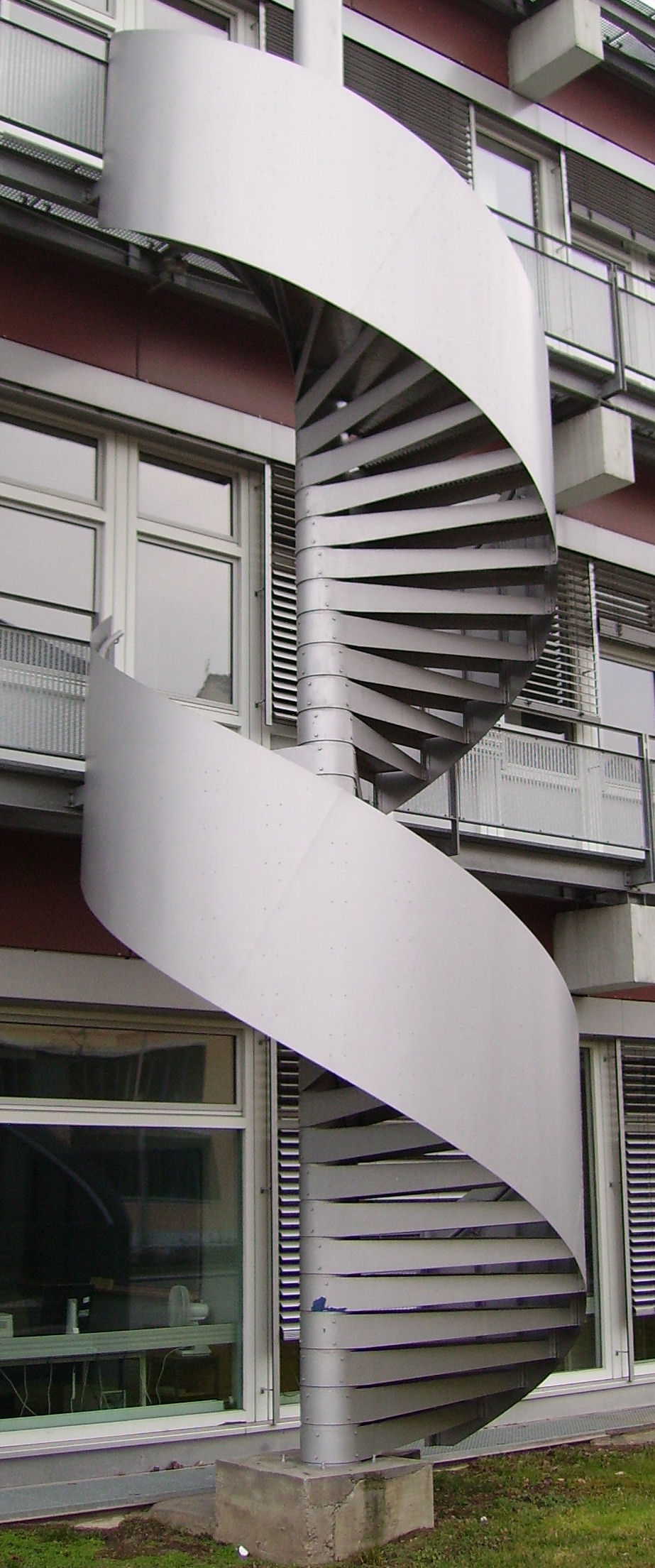
staircase, University Mannheim, Germany

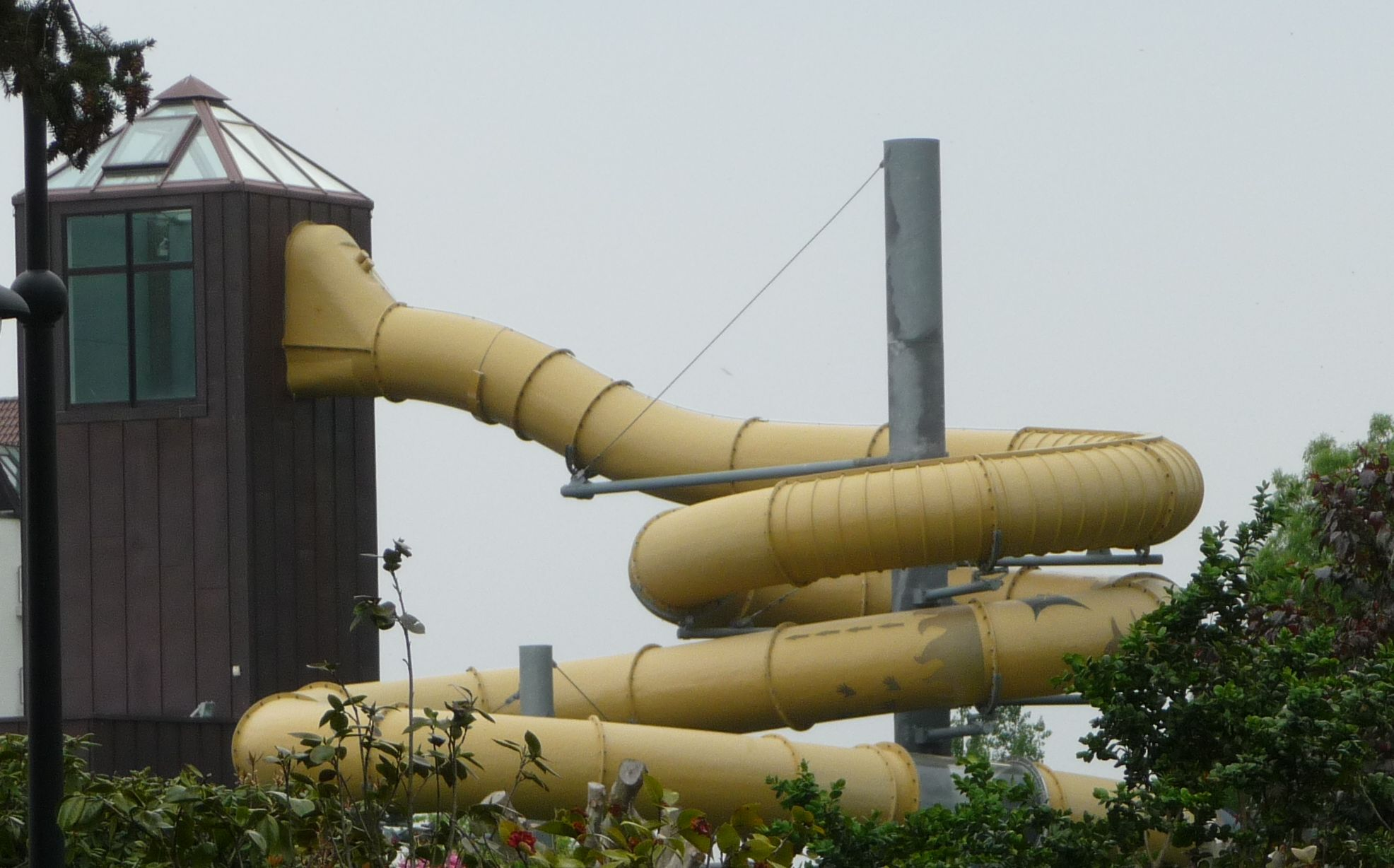
pipe slide Salinarium

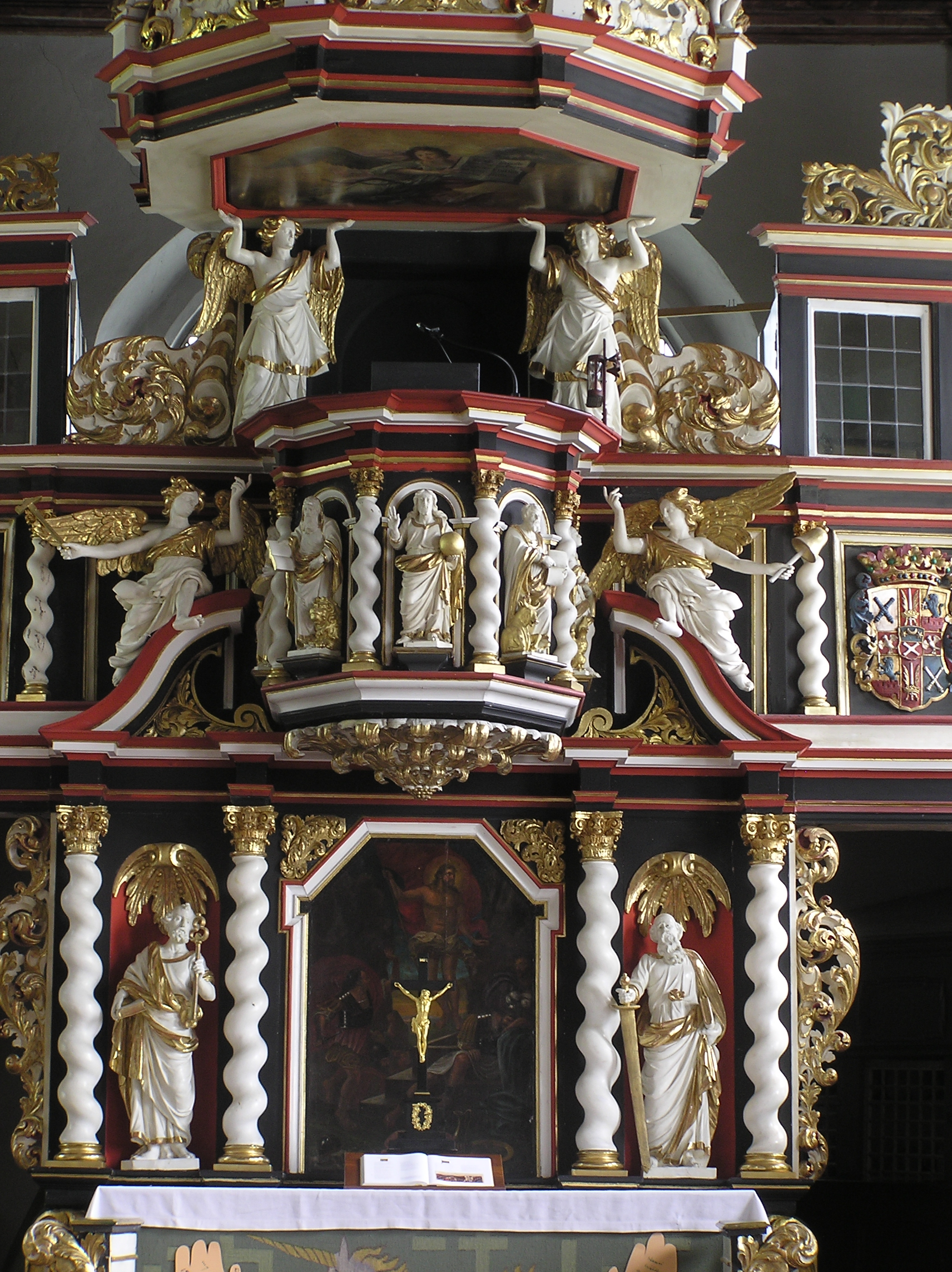
altar (1688), St. Pankratius, Neuenfelde, Germany

== See also ==
- Helicoid
- Minimal surface
- Helix
- Ruled surface
- Catalan surface
- Conoid
- Surface of revolution
