= Pinch point (mathematics) =

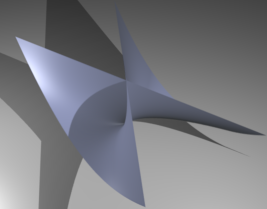
Section of the Whitney umbrella, an example of pinch point singularity.

In geometry, a pinch point or cuspidal point is a type of singular point on an algebraic surface.

The equation for the surface near a pinch point may be put in the form

$$f(u,v,w) = u^2 - vw^2 + [4] \,$$

where [4] denotes terms of degree 4 or more and $v$ is not a square in the ring of functions.

For example the surface $1-2x+x^2-yz^2=0$ near the point $(1,0,0)$, meaning in coordinates vanishing at that point, has the form above. In fact, if $u=1-x, v=y$ and $w=z$ then {$u, v, w$} is a system of coordinates vanishing at $(1,0,0)$ then $1-2x+x^2-yz^2=(1-x)^2-yz^2=u^2-vw^2$ is written in the canonical form.

The simplest example of a pinch point is the hypersurface defined by the equation $u^2-vw^2=0$ called Whitney umbrella.

The pinch point (in this case the origin) is a limit of normal crossings singular points (the $v$-axis in this case). These singular points are intimately related in the sense that in order to resolve the pinch point singularity one must blow-up the whole $v$-axis and not only the pinch point.

== See also ==
- Whitney umbrella
- Singular point of an algebraic variety
