= Whitney umbrella =

Right conoid ruled surface

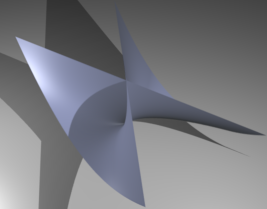
Section of the surface

In geometry, the Whitney umbrella or Whitney's umbrella, named after American mathematician Hassler Whitney, and sometimes called a Cayley umbrella, is a specific self-intersecting ruled surface placed in three dimensions. It is the union of all straight lines that pass through points of a fixed parabola and are perpendicular to a fixed straight line which is parallel to the axis of the parabola and lies on its perpendicular bisecting plane.

== Formulas ==
Whitney's umbrella can be given by the parametric equations in Cartesian coordinates

$$\left\{\begin{align}
x(u, v) &= uv, \\
y(u, v) &= u, \\
z(u, v) &= v^2,
\end{align}\right.$$

where the parameters u and v range over the real numbers. It is also given by the implicit equation

$$x^2 - y^2 z = 0.$$

This formula also includes the negative z axis (which is called the handle of the umbrella).

== Properties ==
Whitney umbrella as a ruled surface, generated by a moving straight line

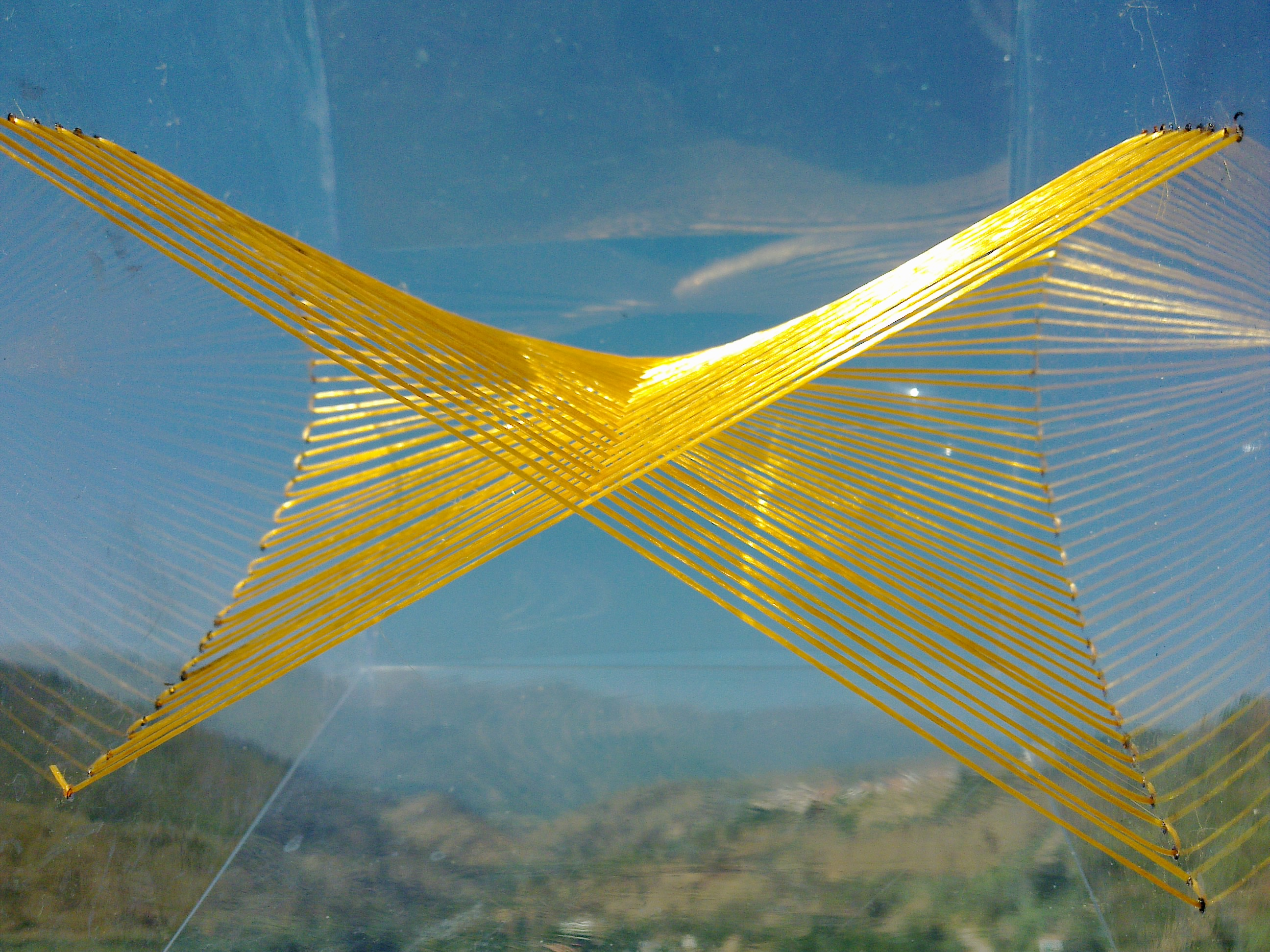
Whitney umbrella made with a single string inside a plastic cube

Whitney's umbrella is a ruled surface and a right conoid. It is important in the field of singularity theory, as a simple local model of a pinch point singularity. The pinch point and the fold singularity are the only stable local singularities of maps from R^{2} to R^{3}.

It is named after the American mathematician Hassler Whitney.

In string theory, a Whitney brane is a D7-brane wrapping a variety whose singularities are locally modeled by the Whitney umbrella. Whitney branes appear naturally when taking Sen's weak coupling limit of F-theory.

== See also ==
- Cross-cap
- Right conoid
- Ruled surface
