= Helicoid =

Mathematical shape

A helicoid with α = 1, −1 ≤ ρ ≤ 1 and −π ≤ θ ≤ π.

The helicoid, also known as helical surface, is a smooth surface embedded in three-dimensional space. It is the surface traced by an infinite line that is simultaneously being rotated and lifted along its fixed axis of rotation. It is the third minimal surface to be known, after the plane and the catenoid.

== Description ==
It was described by Euler in 1774 and by Jean Baptiste Meusnier in 1776. Its name derives from its similarity to the helix: for every point on the helicoid, there is a helix contained in the helicoid which passes through that point.

The helicoid is also a ruled surface (and a right conoid), meaning that it is a trace of a line. Alternatively, for any point on the surface, there is a line on the surface passing through it. Indeed, Catalan proved in 1842 that the helicoid and the plane were the only ruled minimal surfaces.

A helicoid is also a translation surface in the sense of differential geometry.

The helicoid and the catenoid are parts of a family of helicoid-catenoid minimal surfaces.

The helicoid is shaped like Archimedes screw, but extends infinitely in all directions. It can be described by the following parametric equations in Cartesian coordinates:

$$x = \rho \cos (\alpha \theta), \$$
$$y = \rho \sin (\alpha \theta), \$$
$$z = \theta, \$$

where ρ and θ range from negative infinity to positive infinity, while α is a constant. If α is positive, then the helicoid is right-handed as shown in the figure; if negative then left-handed.

The helicoid has principal curvatures $\pm \alpha /(1+ \alpha^2 \rho ^2) \$. The sum of these quantities gives the mean curvature (zero since the helicoid is a minimal surface) and the product gives the Gaussian curvature.

The helicoid is homeomorphic to the plane $\mathbb{R}^2$. To see this, let α decrease continuously from its given value down to zero. Each intermediate value of α will describe a different helicoid, until α = 0 is reached and the helicoid becomes a vertical plane.

Conversely, a plane can be turned into a helicoid by choosing a line, or axis, on the plane, then twisting the plane around that axis.

If a helicoid of radius R revolves by an angle of θ around its axis while rising by a height h, the area of the surface is given by

$$\frac{\theta}{2} \left[R \sqrt{R^2+c^2}+c^2 \ln \left(\frac{R  + \sqrt{R^2+c^2}} c\right) \right],
\ c = \frac{h}{\theta}.$$

== Helicoid and catenoid ==
Animation showing the local isometry of a helicoid segment and a catenoid segment.

The helicoid and the catenoid are locally isometric surfaces; see Catenoid#Helicoid transformation.

== See also ==
- Generalized helicoid
- Dini's surface
- Right conoid
- Ruled surface
