= Ruled surface =

Surface containing a line through every point

Definition of a ruled surface: every point lies on a line

In geometry, a surface S in 3-dimensional Euclidean space is ruled (also called a scroll) if through every point of S, there is a straight line that lies on S. Examples include the plane, the lateral surface of a cylinder or cone, a conical surface with elliptical directrix, the right conoid, the helicoid, and the tangent developable of a smooth curve in space.

A ruled surface can be described as the set of points swept by a moving straight line. For example, a cone is formed by keeping one point of a line fixed whilst moving another point along a circle. A surface is doubly ruled if through every one of its points there are two distinct lines that lie on the surface. The hyperbolic paraboloid and the hyperboloid of one sheet are doubly ruled surfaces. The plane is the only surface which contains at least three distinct lines through each of its points (Fuchs & Tabachnikov 2007).

The properties of being ruled or doubly ruled are preserved by projective maps, and therefore are concepts of projective geometry. In algebraic geometry, ruled surfaces are sometimes considered to be surfaces in affine or projective space over a field, but they are also sometimes considered as abstract algebraic surfaces without an embedding into affine or projective space, in which case "straight line" is understood to mean an affine or projective line.

== Definition and parametric representation ==
Ruled surface generated by two Bézier curves as directrices (red, green)

A surface in 3-dimensional Euclidean space is called a ruled surface if it is the union of a differentiable one-parameter family of lines. Formally, a ruled surface is a surface in $\mathbb R^3$ that is described by a parametric representation of the form
$$\mathbf x(u,v) = \mathbf c(u) + v \mathbf r(u)$$
for $u$ varying over an interval and $v$ ranging over the reals. It is required that $\mathbf r(u) \neq (0,0,0)$, and both $\mathbf c$ and $\mathbf r$ should be differentiable.

Any straight line $v \mapsto \mathbf x(u_0,v)$ with fixed parameter $u=u_0$ is called a generator. The vectors $\mathbf r(u)$ describe the directions of the generators. The curve $u\mapsto \mathbf c(u)$ is called the directrix of the representation. The directrix may collapse to a point (in case of a cone, see example below).

The ruled surface above may alternatively be described by
$$\mathbf x(u,v) = (1-v) \mathbf c(u) + v \mathbf d(u)$$

with the second directrix $\mathbf d(u)= \mathbf c(u) + \mathbf r(u)$. To go back to the first description starting with two non intersecting curves $\mathbf c(u), \mathbf d(u)$ as directrices, set $\mathbf r(u)= \mathbf d(u) - \mathbf c(u).$

The geometric shape of the directrices and generators are of course essential to the shape of the ruled surface they produce. However, the specific parametric representations of them also influence the shape of the ruled surface.

== Examples ==
=== Right circular cylinder ===
cylinder, cone

A right circular cylinder is given by the equation
$$x^2+y^2=a^2.$$
It can be parameterized as
$$\begin{align}
\mathbf x(u,v) &= (a\cos u,a\sin u,v) \\
&= (a\cos u,a\sin u,0) + v (0,0,1) \\
&= (1-v) (a\cos u,a\sin u,0) + v (a\cos u,a\sin u,1).
\end{align}$$
with

- $\mathbf c(u) = (a\cos u,a\sin u,0),$
- $\mathbf r(u) = (0,0,1),$
- $\mathbf d(u) = (a\cos u,a\sin u,1).$

=== Right circular cone ===
A right circular cylinder is given by the equation
$$x^2+y^2=z^2.$$
It can be parameterized as
$$\begin{align}
\mathbf x(u,v) &= (\cos u,\sin u,1) + v (\cos u,\sin u,1) \\
&= (1-v) (\cos u,\sin u,1) + v (2\cos u,2\sin u,2).
\end{align}$$
with

- $\mathbf c(u) = (\cos u,\sin u,1),$
- $\mathbf r(u) = (\cos u,\sin u,1),$
- $\mathbf d(u) = (2\cos u,2\sin u,2).$

In this case one could have used the apex as the directrix, i.e.
$$\mathbf c(u) = (0,0,0)$$
and
$$\mathbf r(u) = (\cos u,\sin u,1)$$
as the line directions.

For any cone one can choose the apex as the directrix. This shows that the directrix of a ruled surface may degenerate to a point.

=== Helicoid ===
helicoid

A helicoid can be parameterized as
$$\begin{align}
\mathbf x(u,v) &= (v\cos u,v\sin u, ku) \\
&= (0,0,ku) + v (\cos u, \sin u, 0) \\
&= (1-v) (0,0,ku) + v (\cos u,\sin u, ku).
\end{align}$$
The directrix
$$\mathbf c(u) = (0,0,ku)$$
is the z-axis, the line directions are
$$\mathbf r(u) = (\cos u, \sin u, 0),$$
and the second directrix
$$\mathbf d(u) = (\cos u,\sin u, ku)$$
is a helix.

The helicoid is a special case of the ruled generalized helicoids.

=== Cylinder, cone and hyperboloids ===
hyperboloid of one sheet for $\varphi=63^\circ$

The parametric representation
$$\mathbf x(u,v) = (1-v) (\cos (u-\varphi), \sin(u-\varphi),-1) + v (\cos(u+\varphi), \sin(u+\varphi), 1)$$
has two horizontal circles as directrices. The additional parameter $\varphi$ allows to vary the parametric representations of the circles. For

- $\varphi=0$ one gets the cylinder $x^2+y^2=1$,
- $\varphi=\pi/2$ one gets the cone $x^2+y^2=z^2$,
- $0<\varphi<\pi/2$ one gets a hyperboloid of one sheet with equation $\frac{x^2+y^2}{a^2}-\frac{z^2}{c^2}=1$ and the semi axes $a=\cos\varphi, c=\cot\varphi$.

A hyperboloid of one sheet is a doubly ruled surface.

=== Hyperbolic paraboloid ===
Hyperbolic paraboloid

If the two directrices in (CD) are the lines
$$\mathbf c(u) =(1-u)\mathbf a_1 + u\mathbf a_2, \quad \mathbf d(u)=(1-u)\mathbf b_1 + u\mathbf b_2$$
one gets
$$\mathbf x(u,v)=(1-v)\big((1-u)\mathbf a_1 + u\mathbf a_2\big) + v\big((1-u)\mathbf b_1 + u\mathbf b_2\big)$$
, which is the hyperbolic paraboloid that interpolates the 4 points $\mathbf a_1, \mathbf a_2, \mathbf b_1, \mathbf b_2$ bilinearly.

The surface is doubly ruled, because any point lies on two lines of the surface.

For the example shown in the diagram:
$$\mathbf a_1=(0,0,0),\; \mathbf a_2=(1,0,0),\; \mathbf b_1=(0,1,0),\; \mathbf b_2=(1,1,1).$$
The hyperbolic paraboloid has the equation $z=xy$.

=== Möbius strip ===
Möbius strip

The ruled surface
$$\mathbf x(u,v) = \mathbf c(u) + v \mathbf r(u)$$
with

- $\mathbf c(u) = (\cos2u,\sin2u,0)$ (circle as directrix),
- $\mathbf r(u) = ( \cos u \cos 2 u , \cos u \sin 2 u, \sin u ) \quad 0\le u< \pi,$

contains a Möbius strip.

The diagram shows the Möbius strip for $-0.3\le v \le 0.3$.

A simple calculation shows $\det(\mathbf \dot c(0), \mathbf \dot r(0), \mathbf r(0)) \ne 0$ (see next section). Hence the given realization of a Möbius strip is not developable. But there exist developable Möbius strips.

=== Further examples ===
- Conoid
- Catalan surface
- Developable rollers (oloid, sphericon)
- Tangent developable

== Developable surfaces ==
For the determination of the normal vector at a point one needs the partial derivatives of the representation $\mathbf x(u,v) = \mathbf c(u) + v \mathbf r(u)$:
$$\mathbf x_u = \mathbf \dot c(u)+ v \mathbf \dot r(u),$$
$$\mathbf x_v = \mathbf r(u).$$
Hence the normal vector is
$$\mathbf n = \mathbf x_u \times \mathbf x_v = \mathbf \dot c\times \mathbf r + v( \mathbf \dot r \times \mathbf r).$$
Since $\mathbf n \cdot \mathbf r = 0$ (A mixed product with two equal vectors is always 0), $\mathbf r (u_0)$ is a tangent vector at any point $\mathbf x(u_0,v)$. The tangent planes along this line are all the same, if $\mathbf \dot r \times \mathbf r$ is a multiple of $\mathbf \dot c\times \mathbf r$. This is possible only if the three vectors $\mathbf \dot c, \mathbf \dot r, \mathbf r$ lie in a plane, i.e. if they are linearly dependent. The linear dependency of three vectors can be checked using the determinant of these vectors:

The tangent planes along the line $\mathbf x(u_0,v) = \mathbf c(u_0) + v \mathbf r(u_0)$ are equal, if
$$\det(\mathbf \dot c(u_0), \mathbf \dot r(u_0), \mathbf r(u_0)) = 0.$$

A smooth surface with zero Gaussian curvature is called developable into a plane, or just developable. The determinant condition can be used to prove the following statement:

A ruled surface $\mathbf x(u,v) = \mathbf c(u) + v \mathbf r(u)$ is developable if and only if
$$\det(\mathbf \dot c, \mathbf \dot r, \mathbf r) = 0$$
at every point.

The generators of any ruled surface coalesce with one family of its asymptotic lines. For developable surfaces they also form one family of its lines of curvature. It can be shown that any developable surface is a cone, a cylinder, or a surface formed by all tangents of a space curve.

Developable connection of two ellipses and its development

The determinant condition for developable surfaces is used to determine numerically developable connections between space curves (directrices). The diagram shows a developable connection between two ellipses contained in different planes (one horizontal, the other vertical) and its development.

An impression of the usage of developable surfaces in Computer Aided Design (CAD) is given in Interactive design of developable surfaces.

A historical survey on developable surfaces can be found in Developable Surfaces: Their History and Application.

== Ruled surfaces in algebraic geometry ==
In algebraic geometry, ruled surfaces were originally defined as projective surfaces in projective space containing a straight line through any given point. This immediately implies that there is a projective line on the surface through any given point, and this condition is now often used as the definition of a ruled surface: ruled surfaces are defined to be abstract projective surfaces satisfying this condition that there is a projective line through any point. This is equivalent to saying that they are birational to the product of a curve and a projective line. Sometimes a ruled surface is defined to be one satisfying the stronger condition that it has a fibration over a curve with fibers that are projective lines. This excludes the projective plane, which has a projective line though every point but cannot be written as such a fibration.

Ruled surfaces appear in the Enriques classification of projective complex surfaces, because every algebraic surface of Kodaira dimension $-\infty$ is a ruled surface (or a projective plane, if one uses the restrictive definition of ruled surface). Every minimal projective ruled surface other than the projective plane is the projective bundle of a 2-dimensional vector bundle over some curve. The ruled surfaces with base curve of genus 0 are the Hirzebruch surfaces.

== Ruled surfaces in architecture ==
Doubly ruled surfaces are the inspiration for curved hyperboloid structures that can be built with a latticework of straight elements, namely:

- Hyperbolic paraboloids, such as saddle roofs.
- Hyperboloids of one sheet, such as cooling towers and some trash bins.

The RM-81 Agena rocket engine employed straight cooling channels that were laid out in a ruled surface to form the throat of the nozzle section.

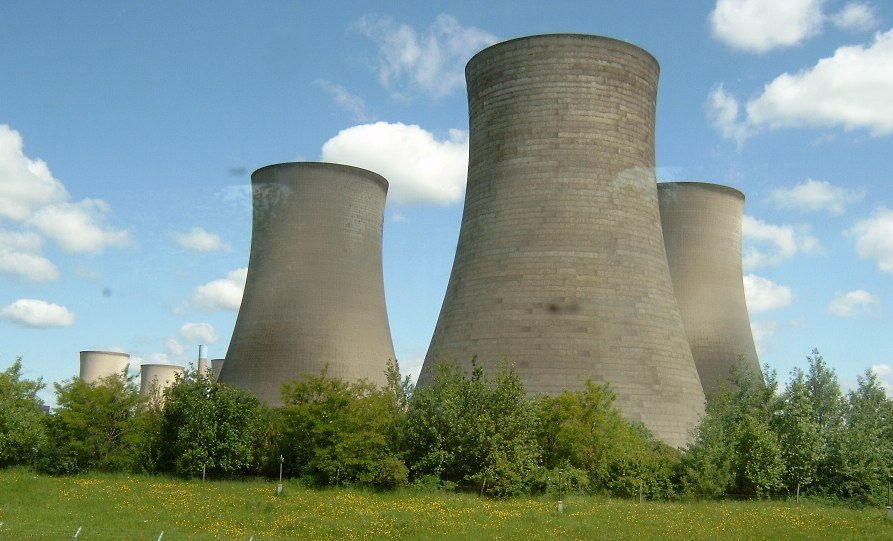
Cooling hyperbolic towers at Didcot Power Station, UK; the surface can be doubly ruled.

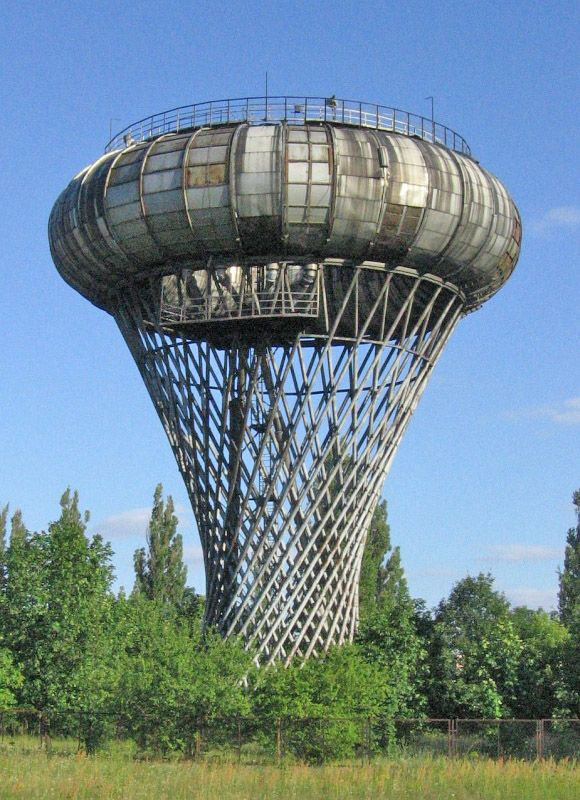
Doubly ruled water tower with toroidal tank, by Jan Bogusławski in Ciechanów, Poland

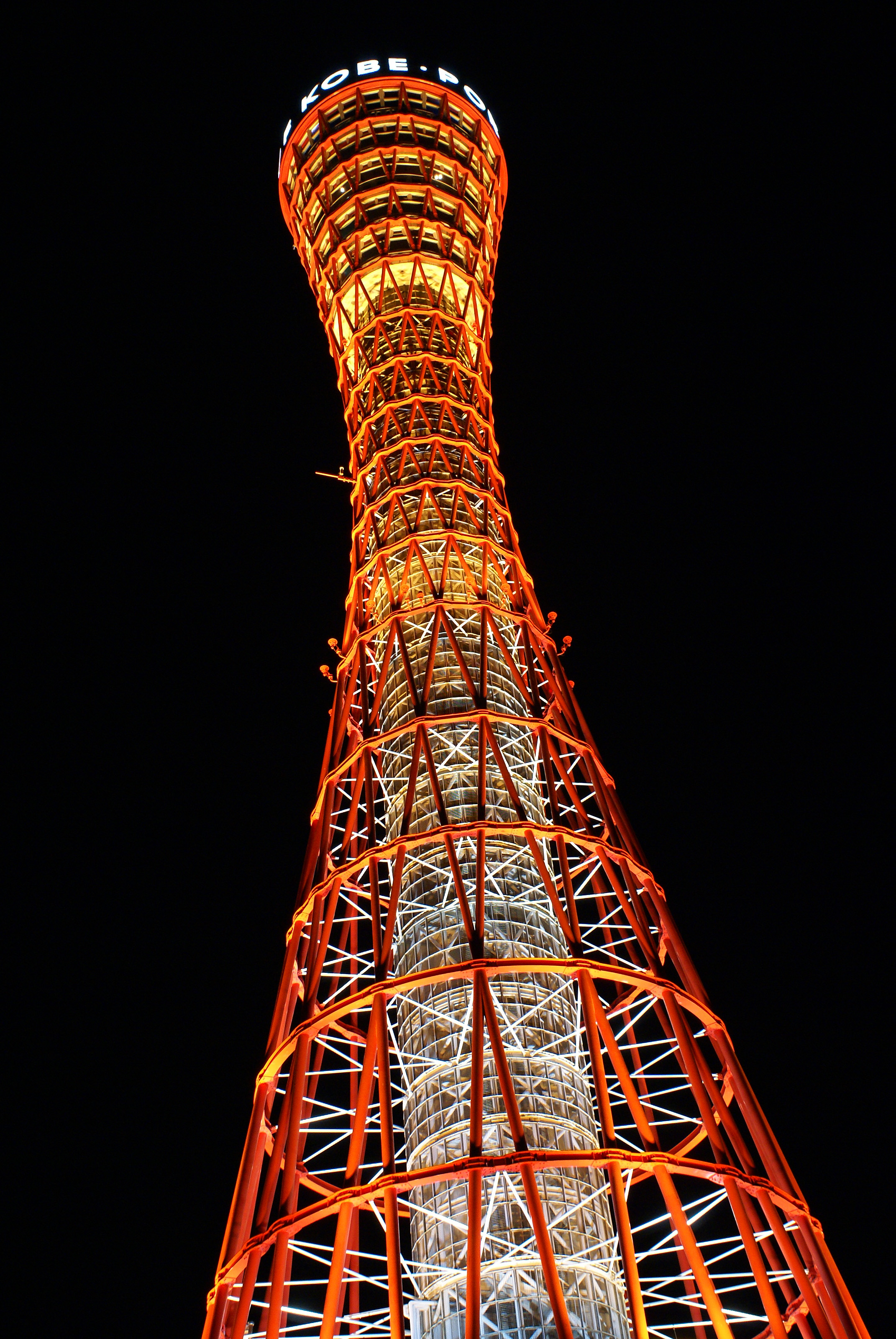
A hyperboloid Kobe Port Tower, Kobe, Japan, with a double ruling.

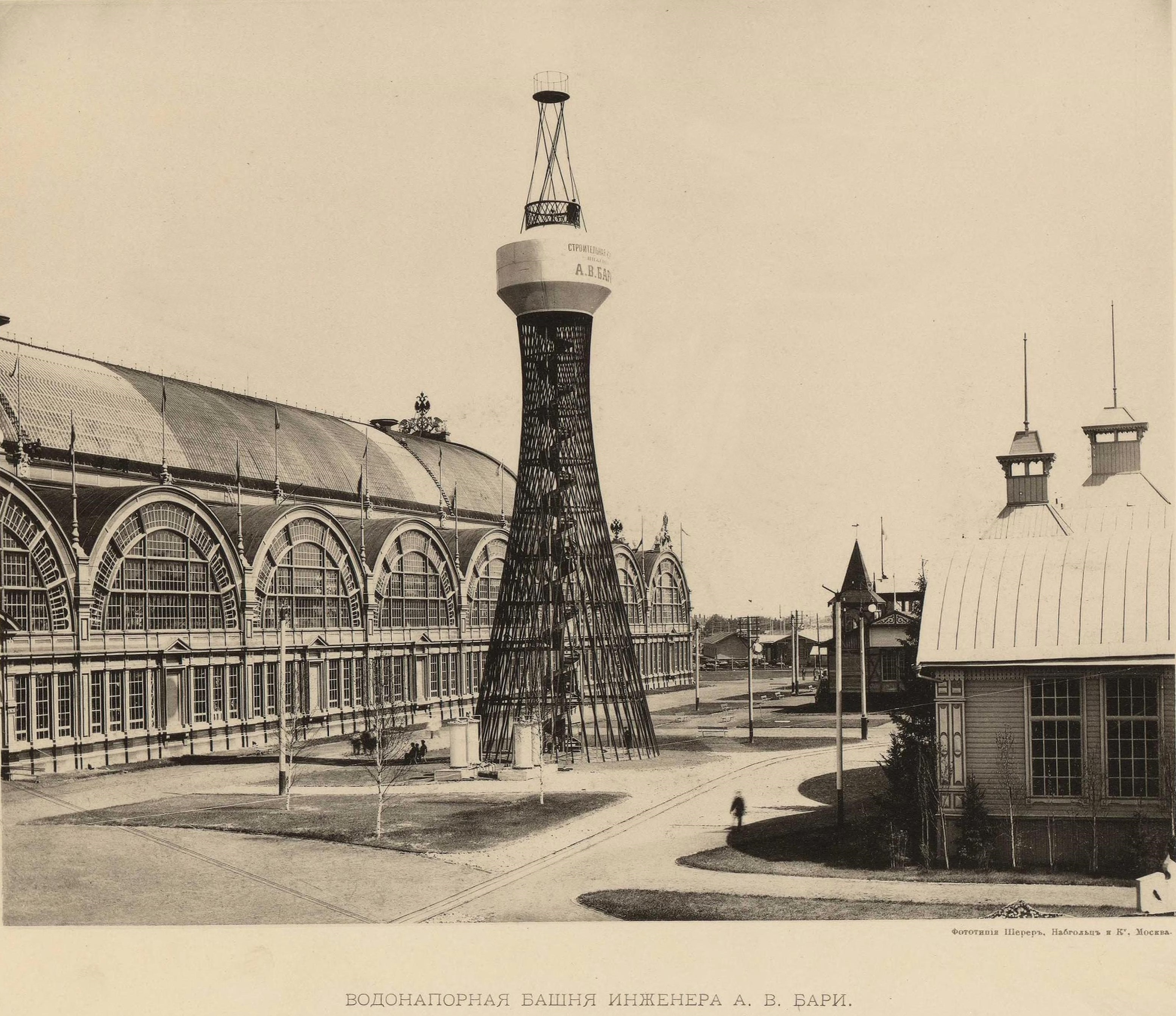
Hyperboloid water tower, 1896 in Nizhny Novgorod.

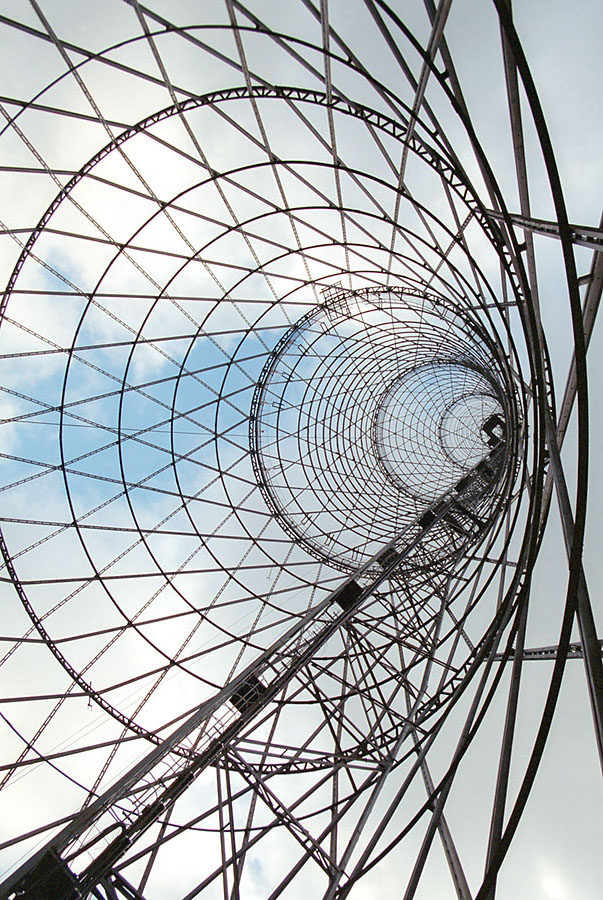
The gridshell of Shukhov Tower in Moscow, whose sections are doubly ruled.

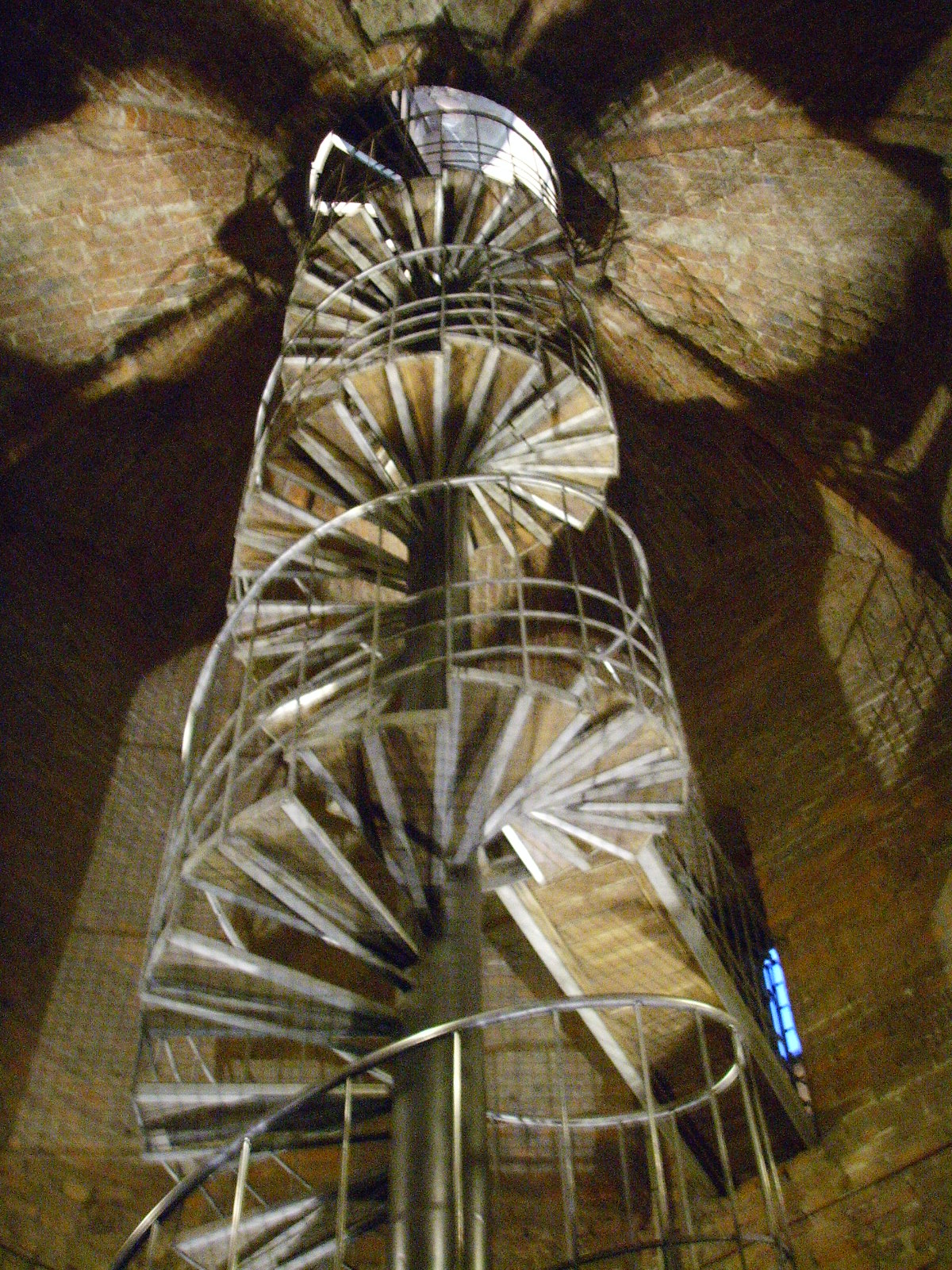
A ruled helicoid spiral staircase inside Cremona's Torrazzo.

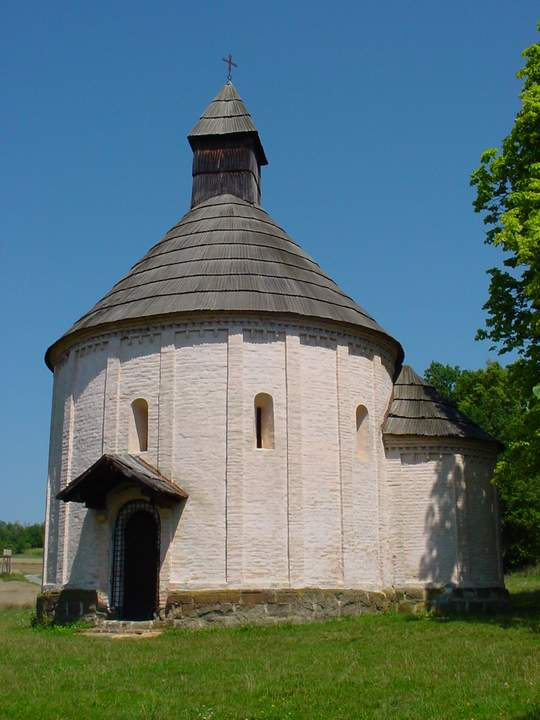
Village church in Selo, Slovenia: both the roof (conical) and the wall (cylindrical) are ruled surfaces.

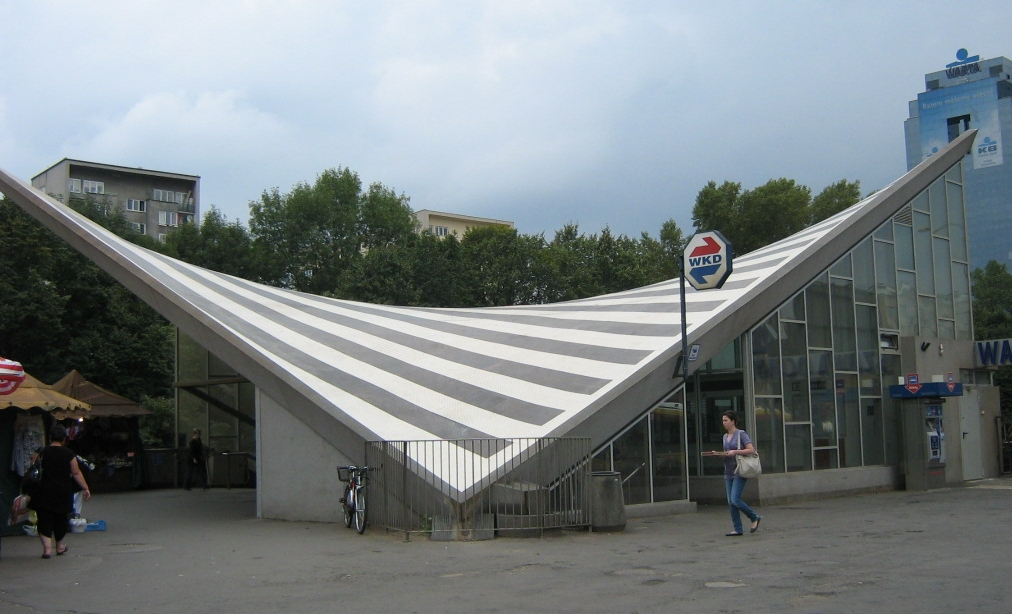
A hyperbolic paraboloid roof of Warszawa Ochota railway station in Warsaw, Poland.

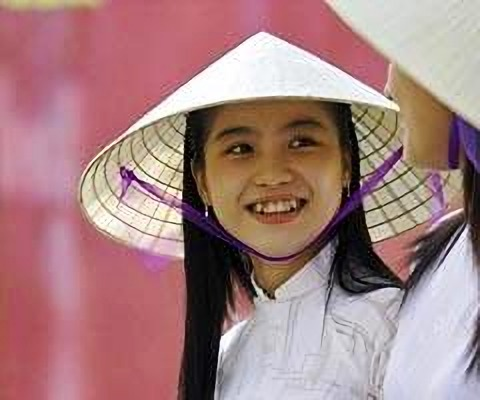
A ruled conical hat.

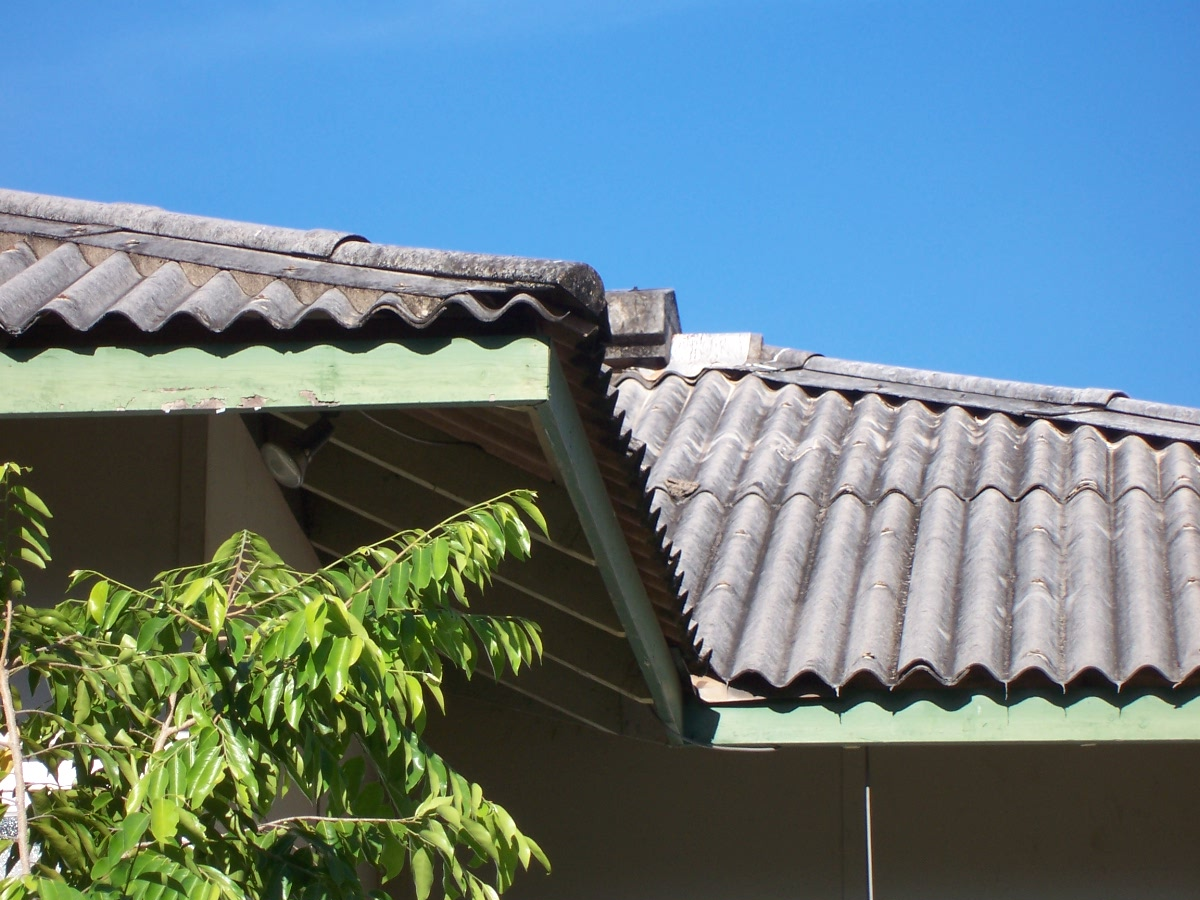
Corrugated roof tiles ruled by parallel lines in one direction, and sinusoidal in the perpendicular direction

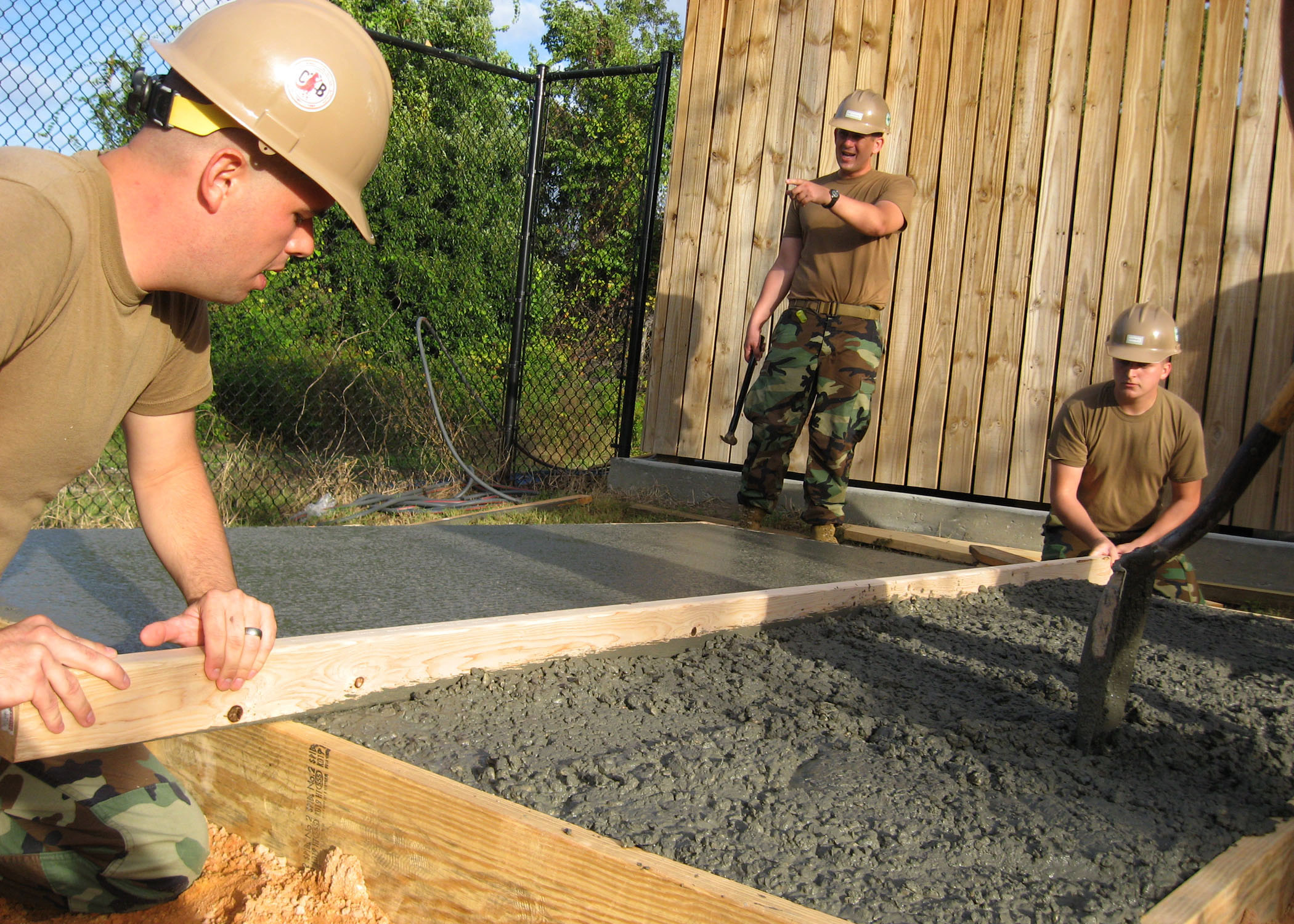
Construction of a planar surface by ruling (screeding) concrete
