= Focal surface =

Focal surfaces (blue, pink) of a hyperbolic paraboloid(white) $z=x^2-y^2,\; 0\le x,y\le 0.5$

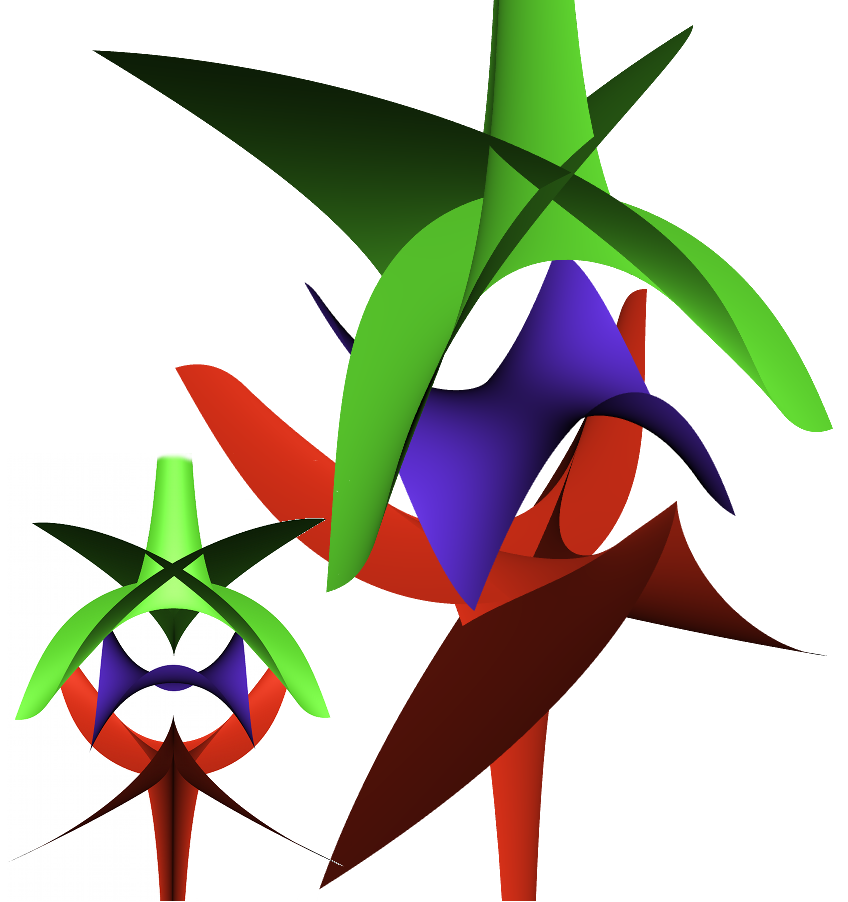
Focal surfaces (green and red) of a monkey saddle (blue). At the center point of the monkey saddle the Gauss curvature is 0, otherwise negative.

For a surface in three dimension the focal surface, surface of centers or evolute is formed by taking the centers of the curvature spheres, which are the tangential spheres whose radii are the reciprocals of one of the principal curvatures at the point of tangency. Equivalently it is the surface formed by the centers of the circles which osculate the curvature lines.

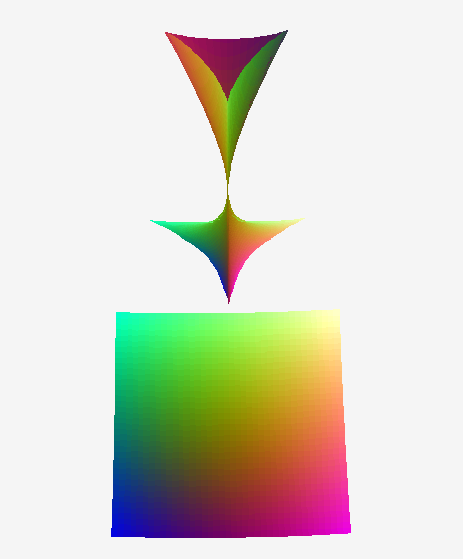
A surface with an elliptical umbilic, and its focal surface.

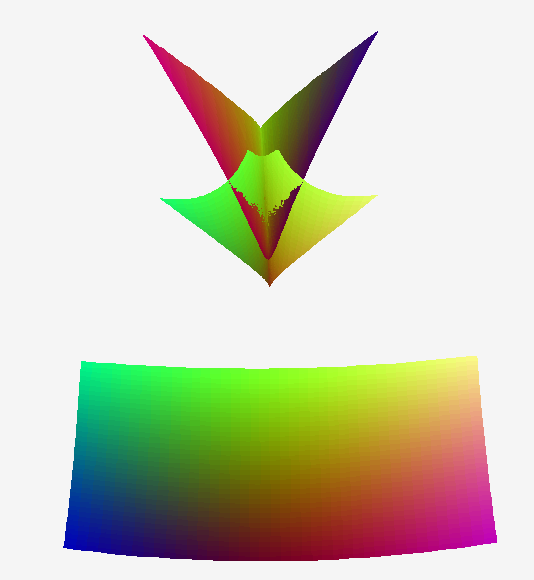
A surface with a hyperbolic umbilic and its focal surface.

As the principal curvatures are the eigenvalues of the second fundamental form, there are two at each point, and these give rise to two points of the focal surface on each normal direction to the surface. At points where the Gaussian curvature is zero, one sheet of the focal surface will have a point at infinity corresponding to the zero principal curvature.

If $\vec p$ is a point of the given surface, $\vec n$ the unit normal and $k_1,k_2$ the principal curvatures at $\vec p$, then

$\vec b_1(\vec p)=\vec p+\frac{\vec n}{k_1} \quad$ and $\quad \vec b_2(\vec p)=\vec p+\frac{\vec n}{k_2}\$

are the corresponding two points of the focal surface.

== Special cases ==
1. The focal surface of a sphere consists of a single point, its center. It is the only surface whose focal surface degenerates into a single point.
2. The focal surface of a Torus consists of the directrix circle and the axis of rotation.
3. More generally, the focal surface of a Dupin cyclide consists of a pair of focal conics. The Dupin cyclides are the only surfaces, whose focal surfaces degenerate into two curves.
4. One part of the focal surface of a surface of revolution consists of the axis of rotation.
5. One part of the focal surface of a channel surface degenerates to its directrix.
6. Two confocal quadrics (for example an ellipsoid and a hyperboloid of one sheet) can be considered as focal surfaces of a surface.

== Singularities ==
Away from umbilical points, the two points on the two focal surfaces are distinct. At umbilical points, the two sheets come together producing a singularity. There are two types of singularities that are structurally stable: the elliptical umbilic and the hyperbolic umbilic.

Where the surface has a ridge, the focal surface has a cuspidal edge correspondingly. Generically, through each elliptical umbilic passes three cuspidal edges; through each hyperbolic umbilic passes one cuspidal edge. The parabolic umbilic is not structurally stable.

== See also ==
- Focus (optics)
- Evolute
