= Dupin cyclide =

Geometric inversion of a torus, cylinder or double cone

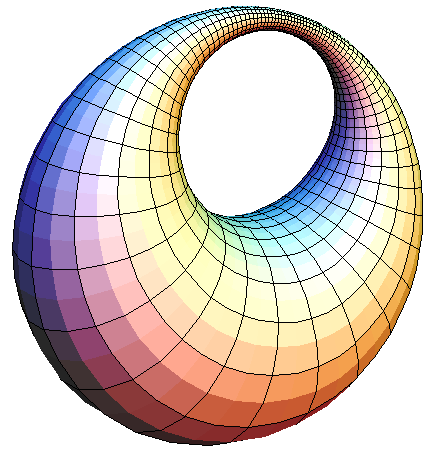
A Dupin cyclide

In mathematics, a Dupin cyclide or cyclide of Dupin is any geometric inversion of a standard torus, cylinder or double cone. In particular, these latter are themselves examples of Dupin cyclides. They were discovered c. 1802 by (and named after) Charles Dupin, while he was still a student at the École polytechnique following Gaspard Monge's lectures. The key property of a Dupin cyclide is that it is a channel surface (envelope of a one-parameter family of spheres) in two different ways. This property means that Dupin cyclides are natural objects in Lie sphere geometry.

Dupin cyclides are often simply known as cyclides, but the latter term is also used to refer to a more general class of quartic surfaces which are important in the theory of separation of variables for the Laplace equation in three dimensions.

Dupin cyclides were investigated not only by Dupin, but also by A. Cayley, J.C. Maxwell and Mabel M. Young.

Dupin cyclides are used in computer-aided design because cyclide patches have rational representations and are suitable for blending canal surfaces (cylinder, cones, tori, and others).

== Definitions and properties ==
There are several equivalent definitions of Dupin cyclides. In $\R^3$, they can be defined as the images under any inversion of tori, cylinders and double cones. This shows that the class of Dupin cyclides is invariant under Möbius (or conformal) transformations. In complex space $\Complex^3$ these three latter varieties can be mapped to one another by inversion, so Dupin cyclides can be defined as inversions of the torus (or the cylinder, or the double cone).

Since a standard torus is the orbit of a point under a two dimensional abelian subgroup of the Möbius group, it follows that the cyclides also are, and this provides a second way to define them.

A third property which characterizes Dupin cyclides is that their curvature lines are all circles (possibly through the point at infinity). Equivalently, the curvature spheres, which are the spheres tangent to the surface with radii equal to the reciprocals of the principal curvatures at the point of tangency, are constant along the corresponding curvature lines: they are the tangent spheres containing the corresponding curvature lines as great circles. Equivalently again, both sheets of the focal surface degenerate to conics. It follows that any Dupin cyclide is a channel surface (i.e., the envelope of a one-parameter family of spheres) in two different ways, and this gives another characterization.

The definition in terms of spheres shows that the class of Dupin cyclides is invariant under the larger group of all Lie sphere transformations; any two Dupin cyclides are Lie-equivalent. They form (in some sense) the simplest class of Lie-invariant surfaces after the spheres, and are therefore particularly significant in Lie sphere geometry.

The definition also means that a Dupin cyclide is the envelope of the one-parameter family of spheres tangent to three given spheres.

== Parametric and implicit representation ==
(CS): A Dupin cyclide can be represented in two ways as the envelope of a one parametric pencil of spheres, i.e. it is a canal surface with two directrices. The pair of directrices are focal conics and consists either of an ellipse and a hyperbola or of two parabolas. In the first case one defines the cyclide as elliptic, in the second case as parabolic. In both cases the conics are contained in two mutually orthogonal planes. In extreme cases (if the ellipse is a circle) the hyperbola degenerates to a line and the cyclide is a torus of revolution.

A further special property of a cyclide is:

(CL): Any curvature line of a Dupin cyclide is a circle.

=== Elliptic cyclides ===
An elliptic cyclide can be represented parametrically by the following formulas (see section Cyclide as channel surface):

Meanings of the design parameters $a,b,c,d$: $d$ is the radius of the generating sphere at the co-vertices of the ellipse The two circles in the x-z-plane with centers $(\pm a,0,0)$ have radii $d\mp c$. Here: $a=1,\; b=0.98 \to c= 0.199$ and $d=0.3$

$$x=\frac{d(c-a\cos u\cos v)+b^2\cos u}{a-c\cos u \cos v} \ ,$$
$$y=\frac{b\sin u (a-d\cos v)}{a-c\cos u \cos v} \ ,$$
$$z=\frac{b\sin v (c \cos u-d)}{a-c\cos u \cos v} \ ,$$
$$0\le u,v <2\pi \ .$$

The numbers $a,b,c,d$ are the semi major and semi minor axes and $c$ the linear eccentricity of the ellipse:

$$\frac{x^2}{a^2}+\frac{y^2}{b^2}=1, z=0\ .$$

The hyperbola $\frac{x^2}{c^2}-\frac{z^2}{b^2}=1, y=0$ is the focal conic to the ellipse. That means: The foci/vertices of the ellipse are the vertices/foci of the hyperbola. The two conics form the two degenerated focal surfaces of the cyclide.

$d$ can be considered as the average radius of the generating spheres.

For $u=const$ , $v=const$ respectively one gets the curvature lines (circles) of the surface.

The corresponding implicit representation is: provided that $b^2+c^2=a^2$

$$(x^2+y^2+z^2+b^2-d^2)^2-4(ax-cd)^2-4b^2y^2=0 \ .$$

In case of $a=b$ one gets $c=0$, i. e. the ellipse is a circle and the hyperbola degenerates to a line. The corresponding cyclides are tori of revolution.

(ellipt.) Dupin cyclides for designparameters a,b,c,d
| $d=0$ | $0<d<c$ | $d=c$ | $c<d$ | $d=a$ | $a<d$ |
| symm. horn cyclide | horn cyclide | horn cyclide | ring cyclide | ring cyclide | spindle cyclide |

More intuitive design parameters are the intersections of the cyclide with the x-axis. See section Cyclide through 4 points on the x-axis.

=== Parabolic cyclides ===
A parabolic cyclide can be represented by the following parametric representation (see section Cyclide as channel surface):

parabolic cyclide with its directrices (focal parabolas)

$$x=\frac{p}{2}\, \frac{2v^2+k(1-u^2-v^2)}{1+u^2+v^2} \ ,$$
$$y=pu\, \frac{v^2+k}{1+u^2+v^2} \ ,$$
$$z=pv\, \frac{1+u^2-k}{1+u^2+v^2} \ ,$$
$$-\infty<u,v<\infty \ .$$

The number $p$ determines the shape of both the parabolas, which are focal conics:

$y^2=p^2-2px, \ z=0\$ and $\ z^2=2px, \ y=0\ .$

$k$ determines the relation of the diameters of the two holes (see diagram). $k=0.5$ means: both diameters are equal. For the diagram is $k=0.7$.

A corresponding implicit representation is

$$\left(x + \left(\frac{k}{2} - 1\right)p \right)\left(x^2+y^2+z^2 - \frac{k^2p^2}{4}\right) + pz^2 = 0 \ .$$

parabolic Dupin cyclides for designparameters p=1, k
| $k=0.5$ | $k=1$ | $k=1.5$ |
| ring cyclide | horn cyclide | horn cyclide |

Remark: By displaying the circles there appear gaps which are caused by the necessary restriction of the parameters $u,v$.

== Cyclide as channel surface ==
Dupin cyclide as channel surface (envelope of a family of spheres)

There are two ways to generate an elliptic Dupin cyclide as a channel surface. The first one uses an ellipse as directrix, the second one a hyperbola:

=== Ellipse as directrix ===
In the x-y-plane the directrix is the ellipse with equation

$\frac{x^2}{a^2}+\frac{y^2}{b^2}=1\ ,\ z=0\quad$ and $\ a>b$.

It has the parametric representation

$$\ x=a\cos\varphi\; ,\ y=b\sin \varphi \;, \ z=0\ .$$

$a$ is the semi major and $b$ the semi minor axis. $c$ is the linear eccentricity of the ellipse. Hence: $c^2=a^2-b^2$. The radii of the generating spheres are

$$r(\varphi)=d-c\cos\varphi \ .$$

$d$ is a design parameter. It can be seen as the average of the radii of the spheres. In case of $c=0$ the ellipse is a circle and the cyclide a torus of revolution with $d$ the radius of the generating circle (generatrix).

In the diagram: $\; a=1,\; b=0.99,\ d=0.25\;$.

Maxwell: Property of the foci of the directrix ellipse. The ellipse is the equidistant set of the blue and purple circles.

=== Maxwell property ===
The following simple relation between the actual sphere center (ellipse point) and the corresponding sphere radius is due to Maxwell:

- The difference/sum of the sphere's radius and the distance of the sphere's center (ellipse point) from one (but fixed) of the foci is constant.

Proof

The foci of the ellipse $\ E=(a\cos\varphi,b\sin\varphi,0)\$ are $\ F_i=(\pm c,0,0)\$. If one chooses $\ F_1=(c,0,0)\$ and calculates the distance $\ |EF_1|\$, one gets $\ |EF_1|=a-c\cos\varphi\$. Together with the radius of the actual sphere (see above) one gets $\ |EF_1|-r=a-d\$.
Choosing the other focus yields: $\ |EF_2|+r=a+d\ .$

Hence:

In the x-y-plane the envelopes of the circles of the spheres are two circles with the foci of the ellipse as centers and the radii $a\pm d$ (see diagram).

=== Cyclide through 4 points on the x-axis ===
Determining the design parameters a,b,c,d belonging to the given reals $x_1,x_2,x_3,x_4$

top: ring cyclide with $x_1=3,x_2=1,x_3=-3,x_4=-7$ middle: horn cyclide with $x_1=1,x_2=3,x_3=-3,x_4=-7$ bottom: spindel cyclide with $x_1=3,x_2=-3,x_3=1,x_4=-7$

The Maxwell-property gives reason for determining a ring cyclide by prescribing its intersections with the x-axis:

Given: Four points $x_1> x_2>x_3>x_4$ on the x-axis (see diagram).

Wanted: Center $m_0$, semiaxes $a,b$, linear eccentricity $c$ and foci of the directrix ellipse and the parameter $d$ of the corresponding ring cyclide.

From the Maxwell-property one derives

$$2(a+d)=x_1-x_4 \; ,\quad \ 2(a-d)=x_2-x_3 \ .$$

Solving for $a,c$ yields

$a=\frac{1}{4}\left(x_1+x_2-x_3-x_4\right),\quad$ $d=\frac{1}{4}\left(x_1-x_2+x_3-x_4\right)\ .$

The foci (on the x-axis) are

$f_1=\frac{1}{2}(x_2+x_3),\quad f_2=\frac{1}{2}(x_1+x_4)$ and hence
$$c=\frac{1}{4}\left(-x_1+x_2+x_3-x_4\right)\; ,\quad \ b=\sqrt{a^2-c^2} \$$

The center of the focal conics (ellipse and hyperbola) has the x-coordinate

$$m_0=\frac{1}{4}\left(x_1+x_2+x_3+x_4\right)\ .$$

If one wants to display the cyclide with help of the parametric representation above one has to consider the shift $m_0$ of the center !

Meaning of the order of the numbers $x_1,x_2,x_3,x_4$

(The calculation above presumes $x_1> x_2>x_3>x_4$, see diagram.)

(H) Swapping $x_1,x_2$ generates a horn cyclide.
(S) Swapping $x_2,x_3$, generates a spindel cyclide.
(H1) For $x_1=x_2=2$ one gets a 1-horn cyclide.
(R) For $x_2=x_3=0$ one gets a ring cyclide touching itself at the origin.

=== Parallel surfaces ===
Parallel surfaces of a ring cyclide with parameters $a=1,b=0.98, \ d=0.30, 0.45, 0.60$

By increasing or decreasing parameter $d$, such that the type does not change, one gets parallel surfaces (similar to parallel curves) of the same type (see diagram).

=== Hyperbola as directrix ===
The second way to generate the ring cyclide as channel surface uses the focal hyperbola as directrix. It has the equation

Cyclide with two touching spheres with centers on the directrix hyperbola

$$\frac{x^2}{c^2}-\frac{z^2}{b^2}=1\ ,\ y=0\ .$$

In this case the spheres touch the cyclide from outside at the second family of circles (curvature lines). To each arm of the hyperbola belongs a subfamily of circles. The spheres of one family enclose the cyclide (in diagram: purple). Spheres of the other family are touched from outside by the cyclide (blue).

Parametric representation of the hyperbola:

$$(\pm c\cosh\psi,0,b\sinh\psi) \ .$$

The radii of the corresponding spheres are

$$R(\psi)=a\cosh\psi\mp d\ .$$

In case of a torus ($c=0$) the hyperbola degenerates into the axis of the torus.

Maxwell-property for the hyperbola case. The hyperbola arm $H_+$ is an equidistant curve of both the grey circles.

=== Maxwell-property (hyperbola case) ===
The foci of the hyperbola $\;H_\pm(\psi)=(\pm c\cosh\psi, 0, b\sinh\psi)\;$ are $\;F_i=(\pm a,0,0)\;$. The distance of hyperbola point $\;H_+(\psi)=(c\cosh\psi,0,b\sinh\psi)\;$ to the focus $F_1$ is $\; |H_+F_1|=a\cosh\psi-c\;$ and together with the sphere radius $R_+(\psi)=a\cosh\psi-d$ one gets $\;|H_+F_1|-R_+=d-c\;$. Analogously one gets $\;|H_+F_2|-R_+=d+c\;$ . For a point on the second arm of the hyperbola one derives the equations: $\;R_--|H_-F_1|=d-c\; ,\ R_--|H_-F_2|=d+c\; .$

Hence:

In the x-z-plane the circles of the spheres with centers $H_\pm(\psi)$ and radii $R_\pm(\psi)$ have the two circles (in diagram grey) with centers $F_{1/2}=(\pm a,0,0)$ and radii $d\mp c$ as envelopes.

Point construction

=== Derivation of the parametric representation ===
==== Elliptic cyclide ====
The ellipse and hyperbola (focal conics) are the degenerated focal surfaces of the elliptic cyclide. For any pair $E, H$ of points of the ellipse and hyperbola the following is true (because of the definition of a focal surface):

1) The line $\overline{EH}$ is a normal of the cyclide and
2) the corresponding point $P$ of the cyclide divides the chord $EH$ with relation $r:R$ (see diagram).

From the parametric representation of the focal conics and the radii of the spheres

Ellipse: $\quad\ \ \ E(u)=(a\cos u,b\sin u,0),\quad r(u)=d-c\cos u \ \ ,$
Hyperbola: $\quad H(v)=(\frac{c}{\cos v}, 0, b\tan v), \quad R(u)=\frac{a}{\cos v}-d\ .$

one gets the corresponding point $P$ of the cyclide (see diagram):

$$\ P(u,v)=\frac{R(v)}{r(u)+R(v)}\;E(u) +\frac{r(u)}{r(u)+R(v)}\;H(v)\ .$$

(For the unusual but convenient parametric representation of the hyperbola: see hyperbola.)

Calculation in detail leads to the parametric representation of the elliptic cyclide given above.

If one uses the parametric representation given in the article on channel surfaces, then, in general, only one family of parametric curves consists of circles.

==== Parabolic cyclide ====
Generation of a parabolic cyclide as channel surface

The derivation of the parametric representation for the parabolic case runs analogously:

With the parametric representations of the focal parabolas (degenerated focal surfaces) and the radii of the spheres:

$$P_1(u)= \left(\frac p 2 (1-u^2),pu,0\right), \quad r_1=\frac p 2 (1-k +u^2)\;$$
$$P_2(v)= \left(\frac p 2 v^2,0,pv\right), \qquad \qquad r_2=\frac p 2 (k+v^2) \$$

one gets

$$\ P(u,v)=\frac{r_2(v)}{r_1(u)+r_2(v)}\;P_1(u) +\frac{r_1(u)}{r_1(u)+r_2(v)}\;P_2(v)$$

which provides the parametric representation above of a parabolic cyclide.

== Dupin cyclides and geometric inversions ==
An advantage for investigations of cyclides is the property:

(I): Any Dupin cyclide is the image either of a right circular cylinder or a right circular double cone or a torus of revolution by an inversion (reflection at a sphere).

The inversion at the sphere with equation $x^2+y^2+z^2=R^2$ can be described analytically by:

$$(x,y,z) \rightarrow \frac{R^2\cdot(x,y,z)}{x^2+y^2+z^2} \ .$$

The most important properties of an inversion at a sphere are:

1. Spheres and circles are mapped on the same objects.
2. Planes and lines containing the origin (center of inversion) are mapped on themselves.
3. Planes and lines not containing the origin are mapped on spheres or circles passing the origin.
4. An inversion is involutory (identical with the inverse mapping).
5. An inversion preserves angles.

One can map arbitrary surfaces by an inversion. The formulas above give in any case parametric or implicit representations of the image surface, if the surfaces are given parametrically or implicitly. In case of a parametric surface one gets:

$$(x(u,v),y(u,v),z(u,v)) \rightarrow \frac{R^2\cdot(x(u,v),y(u,v),z(u,v))}{x(u,v)^2+y(u,v)^2+z(u,v)^2} \ .$$

ring cyclide generated by an inversion of a cylinder at a sphere (magenta)

parabolic ring cyclide generated by an inversion of a cylinder containing the origin

horn cyclide generated by an inversion of a cone

ring cyclide generated by an inversion of a torus

But: Only in case of right circular cylinders and cones and tori of revolution one gets Dupin cyclides and vice versa.

=== Example cylinder ===
a) Because lines, which do not contain the origin, are mapped by an inversion at a sphere (in picture: magenta) on circles containing the origin the image of the cylinder is a ring cyclide with mutually touching circles at the origin. As the images of the line segments, shown in the picture, there appear on line circle segments as images. The spheres which touch the cylinder on the inner side are mapped on a first pencil of spheres which generate the cyclide as a canal surface. The images of the tangent planes of the cylinder become the second pencil of spheres touching the cyclide. The latter ones pass through the origin.
b) The second example inverses a cylinder that contains the origin. Lines passing the origin are mapped onto themselves. Hence the surface is unbounded and a parabolic cyclide.

=== Example cone ===
The lines generating the cone are mapped on circles, which intersect at the origin and the image of the cone's vertex. The image of the cone is a double horn cyclide. The picture shows the images of the line segments (of the cone), which are circles segments, actually.

=== Example torus ===
Both the pencils of circles on the torus (shown in the picture) are mapped on the corresponding pencils of circles on the cyclide. In case of a self-intersecting torus one would get a spindle cyclide.

Villarceau circles

Ring cyclide with Villarceau-circles

Because Dupin ring-cyclides can be seen as images of tori via suitable inversions and an inversion maps a circle onto a circle or line, the images of the Villarceau circles form further two families of circles on a cyclide (see diagram).

Determining the designparameters $a,b,c,d$

The formula of the inversion of a parametric surface (see above) provides a parametric representation of a cyclide (as inversion of a torus) with circles as parametric curves. But the points of a parametric net are not well distributed. So it is better to calculate the design parameters $a,b,c,d$ and to use the parametric representation above:

Cyclide (blue) as image by an inversion of a torus (black) at the unit sphere (red)

Given: A torus, which is shifted out of the standard position along the x-axis. Let be $x_1, x_2,x_3,x_4$ the intersections of the torus with the x-axis (see diagram). All not zero. Otherwise the inversion of the torus would not be a ring-cyclide.
Wanted: semi-axes $a,b$ and linear eccentricity $c$ of the ellipse (directrix) and parameter $d$ of the ring-cyclide, which is the image of the torus under the inversion at the unitsphere.

The inversion maps $x_i$ onto $\tfrac{1}{x_i}$, which are the x-coordinates of 4 points of the ring-cyclide (see diagram). From section Cyclide through 4 points on the x-axis one gets

$a=\frac{1}{4}\left(\frac{1}{x_1}+\frac{1}{x_2}-\frac{1}{x_3}-\frac{1}{x_4}\right),\quad$ $d=\frac{1}{4}\left(-\frac{1}{x_1}+\frac{1}{x_2}-\frac{1}{x_3}+\frac{1}{x_4}\right)\$ and
$$c=\frac{1}{4}\left(\frac{1}{x_1}-\frac{1}{x_2}-\frac{1}{x_3}+\frac{1}{x_4}\right)\; ,\quad \ b=\sqrt{a^2-c^2} \$$

The center of the focal conics has the x-ccordinate

$$m_0=\frac{1}{4}\left(\frac{1}{x_1}+\frac{1}{x_2}+\frac{1}{x_3}+\frac{1}{x_4}\right)\ .$$

== Separation of variables ==
Dupin cyclides are a special case of a more general notion of a cyclide, which is a natural extension of the notion of a quadric surface. Whereas a quadric can be described as the zero set of polynomial of degree two in Cartesian coordinates (x_{1},x_{2},x_{3}), a cyclide is given by the zero set of a polynomial of degree two in (x_{1},x_{2},x_{3},r^{2}), where r^{2}=x_{1}^{2}+x_{2}^{2}+x_{3}^{2}. Thus it is a quartic surface in Cartesian coordinates, with an equation of the form:

$$A r^4 + \sum_{i=1}^3 P_i  x_i r^2 + \sum_{i,j=1}^3 Q_{ij}  x_i  x_j + \sum_{i=1}^3 R_i  x_i + B = 0$$

where Q is a 3x3 matrix, P and R are a 3-dimensional vectors, and A and B are constants.

Families of cyclides give rise to various cyclidic coordinate geometries.

In Maxime Bôcher's 1891 dissertation, Ueber die Reihenentwickelungen der Potentialtheorie, it was shown that the Laplace equation in three variables can be solved using separation of variables in 17 conformally distinct quadric and cyclidic coordinate geometries. Many other cyclidic geometries can be obtained by studying R-separation of variables for the Laplace equation.

== See also ==
- Inversion of curves and surfaces (German)
- Darboux cyclide
- Soddy's hexlet
