= Channel surface =

Surface formed from spheres centered along a curve

canal surface: directrix is a helix, with its generating spheres

pipe surface: directrix is a helix, with generating spheres

pipe surface: directrix is a helix

In geometry and topology, a channel surface or canal surface is a surface formed as the envelope of a family of spheres whose centers lie on a space curve, its directrix. If the radii of the generating spheres are constant, the canal surface is called a pipe surface. Simple examples are:

- right circular cylinder (pipe surface, directrix is a line, the axis of the cylinder)
- torus (pipe surface, directrix is a circle),
- right circular cone (canal surface, directrix is a line (the axis), radii of the spheres not constant),
- surface of revolution (canal surface, directrix is a line).

Canal surfaces play an essential role in descriptive geometry, because in case of an orthographic projection its contour curve can be drawn as the envelope of circles.

- In technical area canal surfaces can be used for blending surfaces smoothly.

== Envelope of a pencil of implicit surfaces ==
Given the pencil of implicit surfaces

$$\Phi_c: f({\mathbf x},c)=0 , c\in [c_1,c_2]$$,

two neighboring surfaces $\Phi_c$ and $\Phi_{c+\Delta c}$ intersect in a curve that fulfills the equations

$f({\mathbf x},c)=0$ and $f({\mathbf x},c+\Delta c)=0$.

For the limit $\Delta c \to 0$ one gets $f_c({\mathbf x},c)= \lim_{\Delta c \to \ 0} \frac{f({\mathbf x},c)-f({\mathbf x},c+\Delta c)}{\Delta c}=0$. The last equation is the reason for the following definition.

- Let $\Phi_c: f({\mathbf x},c)=0 , c\in [c_1,c_2]$ be a 1-parameter pencil of regular implicit $C^2$ surfaces ($f$ being at least twice continuously differentiable). The surface defined by the two equations
  $$f({\mathbf x},c)=0, \quad   f_c({\mathbf x},c)=0$$

is the envelope of the given pencil of surfaces.

== Canal surface ==
Let $\Gamma: {\mathbf x}={\mathbf c}(u)=(a(u),b(u),c(u))^\top$ be a regular space curve and $r(t)$ a $C^1$-function with $r>0$ and $|\dot{r}|<\|\dot{\mathbf c}\|$. The last condition means that the curvature of the curve is less than that of the corresponding sphere. The envelope of the 1-parameter pencil of spheres

$$f({\mathbf x};u):= \big\|{\mathbf x}-{\mathbf c}(u)\big\|^2-r^2(u)=0$$

is called a canal surface and $\Gamma$ its directrix. If the radii are constant, it is called a pipe surface.

== Parametric representation of a canal surface ==
The envelope condition

$$f_u({\mathbf x},u)=
2\Big(-\big({\mathbf x}-{\mathbf c}(u)\big)^\top\dot{\mathbf c}(u)-r(u)\dot{r}(u)\Big)=0$$

of the canal surface above is for any value of $u$ the equation of a plane, which is orthogonal to the tangent $\dot{\mathbf c}(u)$ of the directrix. Hence the envelope is a collection of circles. This property is the key for a parametric representation of the canal surface. The center of the circle (for parameter $u$) has the distance $d:=\frac{r\dot{r}}{\|\dot{\mathbf c}\|}<r$ (see condition above) from the center of the corresponding sphere and its radius is $\sqrt{r^2-d^2}$. Hence

- ${\mathbf x}={\mathbf x}(u,v):= {\mathbf c}(u)-\frac{r(u)\dot{r}(u)}{\|\dot{\mathbf c}(u)\|^2}\dot{\mathbf c}(u) +r(u)\sqrt{1-\frac{\dot{r}(u)^2}{\|\dot{\mathbf c}(u)\|^2}} \big({\mathbf e}_1(u)\cos(v)+ {\mathbf e}_2(u)\sin(v)\big),$

where the vectors ${\mathbf e}_1,{\mathbf e}_2$ and the tangent vector $\dot{\mathbf c}/\|\dot{\mathbf c}\|$ form an orthonormal basis, is a parametric representation of the canal surface.

For $\dot{r}=0$ one gets the parametric representation of a pipe surface:

- ${\mathbf x}={\mathbf x}(u,v):= {\mathbf c}(u)+r\big({\mathbf e}_1(u)\cos(v)+ {\mathbf e}_2(u)\sin(v)\big).$

pipe knot

canal surface: Dupin cyclide

== Examples ==
a) The first picture shows a canal surface with
1. the helix $(\cos(u),\sin(u), 0.25u), u\in[0,4]$ as directrix and
2. the radius function $r(u):= 0.2+0.8u/2\pi$.
3. The choice for ${\mathbf e}_1,{\mathbf e}_2$ is the following:

$${\mathbf e}_1:=(\dot{b},-\dot{a},0)/\|\cdots\|,\
{\mathbf e}_2:= ({\mathbf e}_1\times \dot{\mathbf c})/\|\cdots\|$$.

b) For the second picture the radius is constant:$r(u):= 0.2$, i. e. the canal surface is a pipe surface.
c) For the 3. picture the pipe surface b) has parameter $u\in[0,7.5]$.
d) The 4. picture shows a pipe knot. Its directrix is a curve on a torus
e) The 5. picture shows a Dupin cyclide (canal surface).

== See also ==
- Parallel surface
