= Lie sphere =

Lie sphere may refer to:

- Lie-sphere, the fourth type of classical bounded symmetric domain
- Lie sphere geometry
