= Darboux cyclide =

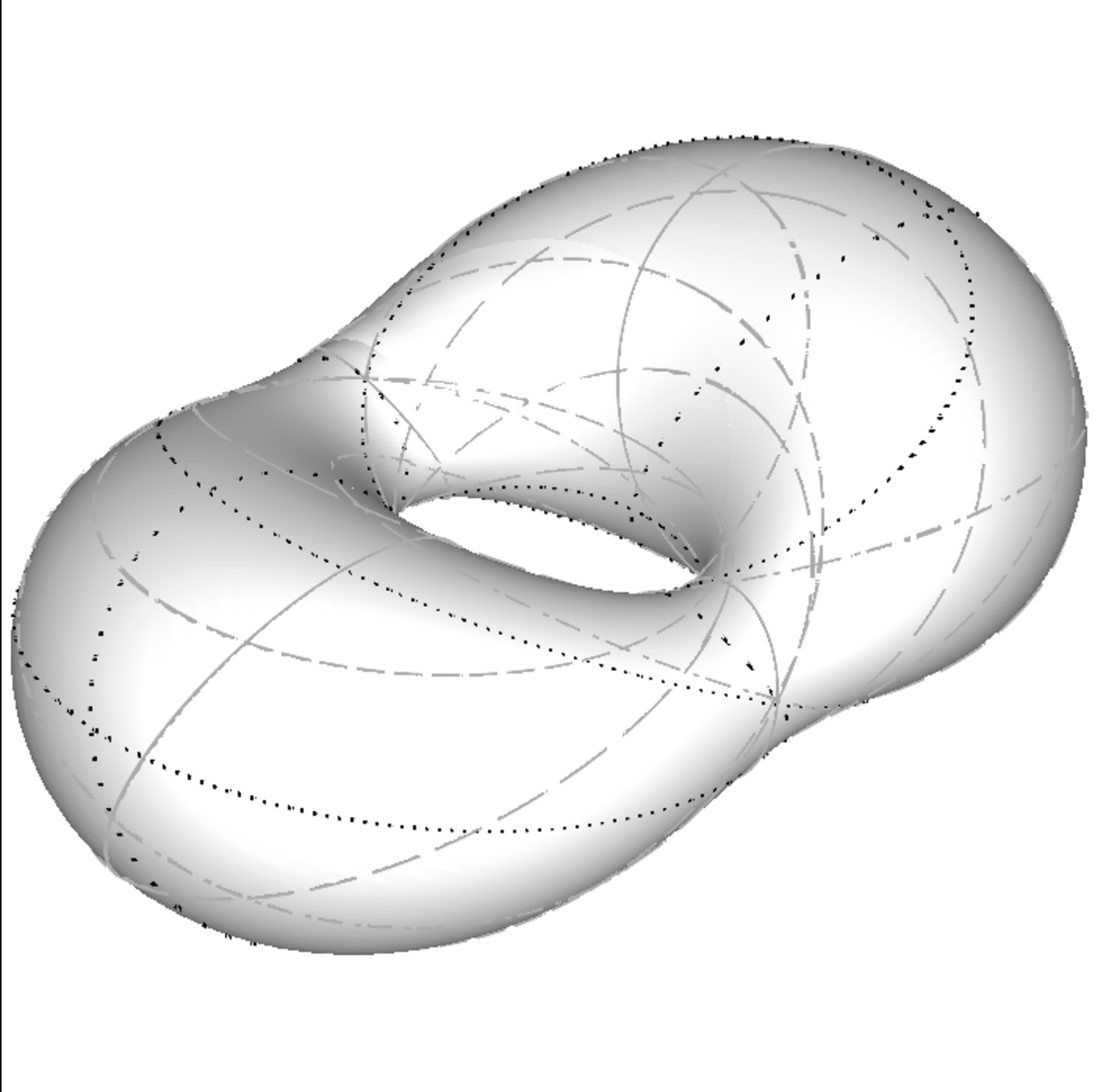
A smooth Darboux cyclide

A Darboux cyclide is an algebraic surface of degree at most 4 that contains multiple families of circles. Named after French mathematician Gaston Darboux who studied these surfaces in 1880, Darboux cyclides are a superset of Dupin cyclides and quadrics. They have applications in architectural geometry and computer-aided geometric design (CAGD).

== Definition ==
A Darboux cyclide is defined as a surface whose equation in a Cartesian coordinate system has the form

$$\lambda(x^2 + y^2 + z^2)^2 + (x^2 + y^2 + z^2)L(x, y, z) + Q(x, y, z) = 0$$

where $\lambda$ is a constant, $L(x, y, z) = \mu x + \nu y + \kappa z$ is a polynomial of degree 1, and $Q$ is a polynomial of degree at most 2 with coefficients that do not vanish simultaneously. If the left-hand side of this equation factors into non-constant polynomials with complex coefficients, the Darboux cyclide is called a reducible cyclide. A reducible cyclide either splits into a union of spheres/planes or degenerates to a curve in $\mathbb R^3$.

== History ==
The mathematical study of Darboux cyclides began with Ernst Kummer's work in 1865, followed by contributions from Gaston Darboux in 1880. Julian Coolidge also analyzed Darboux cyclides in a 1916 monograph. After a period of reduced interest, geometers rediscovered these surfaces in the late 20th century.

== Properties and applications ==
Darboux cyclides can carry up to six families of real circles. These circle families manifest in two distinct types. The first type consists of paired families, where two families of circles are related such that any sphere through a circle of one family intersects the cyclide in a circle of the other family. The second type comprises single families, which arise when the cyclide is generated as a canal surface (the envelope of a one-parameter family of spheres).

A Möbius sphere (also known as an M-sphere) $S$ is the set given by the equation $\lambda \mathbf x^2 + ax + by + cz + d = 0$, where $\lambda, a, b, c, d$ do not vanish simultaneously. Darboux cyclides can exhibit symmetry with respect to up to five pairwise orthogonal Möbius spheres, though at least one of these spheres must be imaginary; that is, one M-sphere has no real points at all.

Smooth Darboux cyclides can be classified topologically into three distinct categories: sphere-like surfaces, toruslike surfaces, and configurations consisting of two spheres.

In architectural geometry, Darboux cyclides have been applied in the rationalization of freeform structures, the process of taking a complex freeform architectural design and breaking it down into parts that can be manufactured and built while maintaining the designer's artistic intent.

== See also ==
- Dupin cyclide
- Möbius geometry
- Algebraic surface
- Architectural geometry
