= Surface of revolution =

Surface created by rotating a curve about an axis

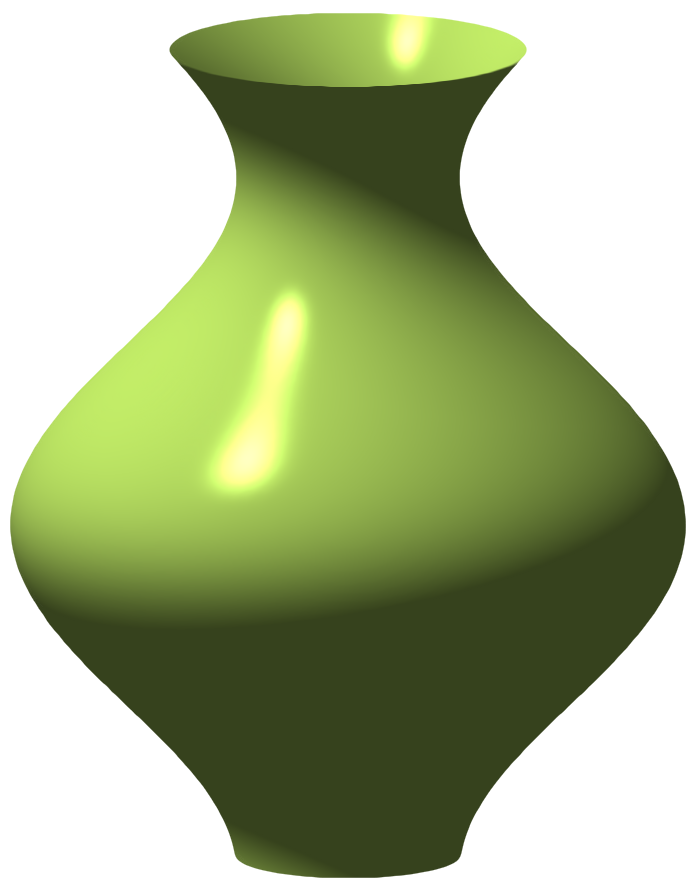
A portion of the curve x = 2 + cos(z) rotated around the z-axis

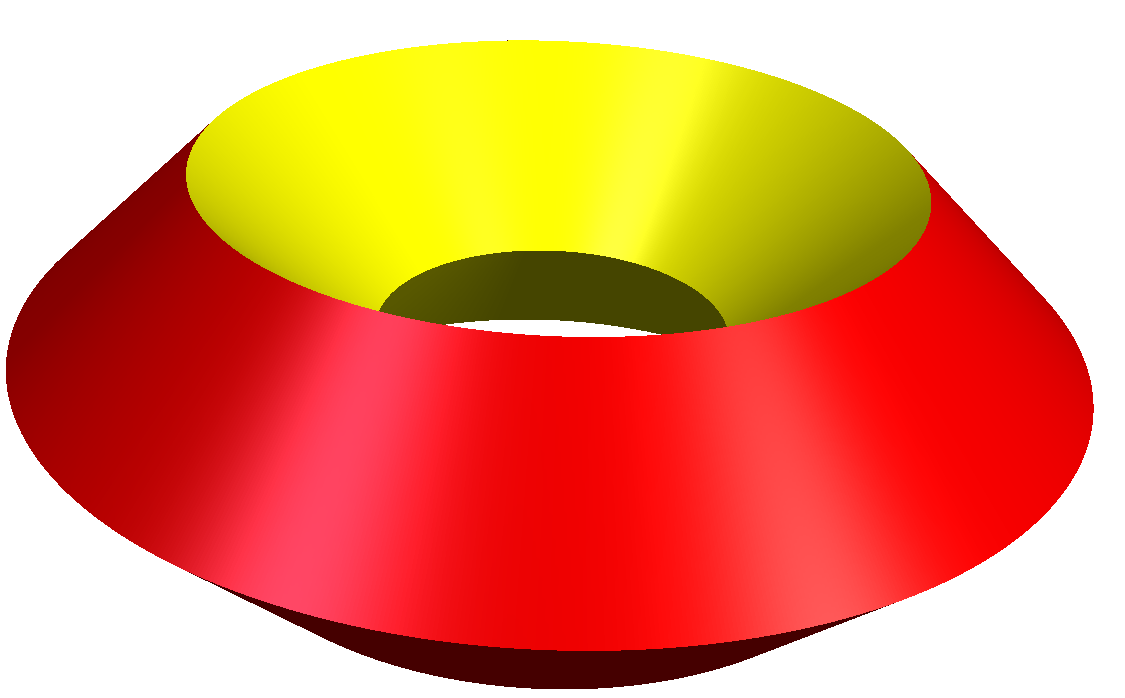
A toroid as a square revolved around an axis parallel to one of its diagonals.

A surface of revolution is a surface in Euclidean space created by rotating a curve (the generatrix) one full revolution around an axis of rotation (normally not intersecting the generatrix, except at its endpoints). The volume bounded by the surface created by this revolution is the solid of revolution.

Examples of surfaces of revolution generated by a straight line are cylindrical and conical surfaces depending on whether or not the line is parallel to the axis. A circle that is rotated around any diameter generates a sphere of which it is then a great circle, and if the circle is rotated around an axis that does not intersect the interior of a circle, then it generates a torus which does not intersect itself (a ring torus).

== Properties ==
The sections of the surface of revolution made by planes through the axis are called meridional sections. Any meridional section can be considered to be the generatrix in the plane determined by it and the axis.

The sections of the surface of revolution made by planes that are perpendicular to the axis are circles.

Some special cases of hyperboloids (of either one or two sheets) and elliptic paraboloids are surfaces of revolution. These may be identified as those quadratic surfaces all of whose cross sections perpendicular to the axis are circular.

== Area formula ==
If the curve is described by the parametric functions x(t), y(t), with t ranging over some interval [a,b], and the axis of revolution is the y-axis, then the surface area A_{y} is given by the integral
$$A_y = 2 \pi \int_a^b x(t) \, \sqrt{\left({dx \over dt}\right)^2 + \left({dy \over dt}\right)^2} \, dt,$$
provided that x(t) is never negative between the endpoints a and b. This formula is the calculus equivalent of Pappus's centroid theorem. The quantity
$$\sqrt{ \left({dx \over dt}\right)^2 + \left({dy \over dt}\right)^2 } \, dt$$
comes from the Pythagorean theorem and represents a small segment of the arc of the curve, as in the arc length formula. The quantity 2πx(t) is the path of (the centroid of) this small segment, as required by Pappus' theorem.

Likewise, when the axis of rotation is the x-axis and provided that y(t) is never negative, the area is given by
$$A_x = 2 \pi \int_a^b y(t) \, \sqrt{\left({dx \over dt}\right)^2 + \left({dy \over dt}\right)^2} \, dt.$$

If the continuous curve is described by the function y = f(x), a ≤ x ≤ b, then the integral becomes
$$A_x = 2\pi\int_a^b y \sqrt{1+\left(\frac{dy}{dx}\right)^2} \, dx = 2\pi\int_a^bf(x)\sqrt{1+\big(f'(x)\big)^2} \, dx$$
for revolution around the x-axis, and
$$A_y =2\pi\int_a^b x \sqrt{1+\left(\frac{dx}{dy}\right)^2} \, dy$$
for revolution around the y-axis (provided a ≥ 0). These come from the above formula.

This can also be derived from multivariable integration. If a plane curve is given by $\langle x(t), y(t) \rangle$ then its corresponding surface of revolution when revolved around the x-axis has Cartesian coordinates given by $\mathbf{r}(t, \theta) = \langle y(t)\cos(\theta), y(t)\sin(\theta), x(t)\rangle$ with $0 \leq \theta \leq 2\pi$. Then the surface area is given by the surface integral
$$A_x = \iint_S dS = \iint_{[a, b] \times [0, 2\pi]} \left\|\frac{\partial \mathbf{r}}{\partial t} \times \frac{\partial \mathbf{r}}{\partial \theta}\right\|\ d\theta\ dt = \int_a^b \int_0^{2\pi} \left\|\frac{\partial \mathbf{r}}{\partial t} \times \frac{\partial \mathbf{r}}{\partial \theta}\right\|\ d\theta\ dt.$$

Computing the partial derivatives yields
$$\frac{\partial \mathbf{r}}{\partial t} = \left\langle \frac{dy}{dt} \cos(\theta), \frac{dy}{dt} \sin(\theta), \frac{dx}{dt} \right\rangle,$$
$$\frac{\partial \mathbf{r}}{\partial \theta} = \langle -y \sin(\theta), y \cos(\theta), 0 \rangle$$
and computing the cross product yields
$$\frac{\partial \mathbf{r}}{\partial t} \times \frac{\partial \mathbf{r}}{\partial \theta}
= \left\langle y \cos(\theta)\frac{dx}{dt}, y \sin(\theta)\frac{dx}{dt}, y \frac{dy}{dt} \right\rangle
= y \left\langle \cos(\theta)\frac{dx}{dt}, \sin(\theta)\frac{dx}{dt}, \frac{dy}{dt} \right\rangle$$
where the trigonometric identity $\sin^2(\theta) + \cos^2(\theta) = 1$ was used. With this cross product, we get
$$\begin{align}
A_x
&= \int_a^b \int_0^{2\pi} \left\|\frac{\partial \mathbf{r}}{\partial t} \times \frac{\partial \mathbf{r}}{\partial \theta}\right\|\ d\theta\ dt \\[1ex]
&= \int_a^b \int_0^{2\pi} \left\|y \left\langle y \cos(\theta)\frac{dx}{dt}, y \sin(\theta)\frac{dx}{dt}, y \frac{dy}{dt} \right\rangle \right\|\ d\theta\ dt \\[1ex]
&= \int_a^b \int_0^{2\pi} y \sqrt{\cos^2(\theta)\left(\frac{dx}{dt} \right)^2 + \sin^2(\theta)\left(\frac{dx}{dt}\right)^2 + \left(\frac{dy}{dt}\right)^2}\ d\theta\ dt \\[1ex]
&= \int_a^b \int_0^{2\pi} y \sqrt{\left(\frac{dx}{dt} \right)^2 + \left(\frac{dy}{dt} \right)^2}\ d\theta\ dt \\[1ex]
&= \int_a^b 2\pi y \sqrt{\left(\frac{dx}{dt} \right)^2 + \left(\frac{dy}{dt} \right)^2}\ dt
\end{align}$$
where the same trigonometric identity was used again. The derivation for a surface obtained by revolving around the y-axis is similar.

For example, the spherical surface with unit radius is generated by the curve y(t) = sin(t), x(t) = cos(t), when t ranges over [0,π]. Its area is therefore
$$\begin{align}
A
&{}= 2 \pi \int_0^\pi \sin(t) \sqrt{\big(\cos(t)\big)^2 + \big(\sin(t)\big)^2} \, dt \\
&{}= 2 \pi \int_0^\pi \sin(t) \, dt \\
&{}= 4\pi.
\end{align}$$

For the case of the spherical curve with radius r, y(x) = √r^{2} − x^{2} rotated about the x-axis
$$\begin{align}
A
&= 2 \pi \int_{-r}^{r} \sqrt{r^2 - x^2}\,\sqrt{1 + \frac{x^2}{r^2 - x^2}}\,dx \\
&= 2 \pi r\int_{-r}^{r} \,\sqrt{r^2 - x^2}\,\sqrt{\frac{1}{r^2 - x^2}}\,dx \\
&= 2 \pi r\int_{-r}^{r} \,dx \\
&= 4 \pi r^2\,
\end{align}$$

A minimal surface of revolution is the surface of revolution of the curve between two given points which minimizes surface area. A basic problem in the calculus of variations is finding the curve between two points that produces this minimal surface of revolution.

There are only two minimal surfaces of revolution (surfaces of revolution which are also minimal surfaces): the plane and the catenoid.

== Coordinate expressions ==
A surface of revolution given by rotating a curve described by $y = f(x)$ around the x-axis may be most simply described by $y^2+z^2 = f(x)^2$. This yields the parametrization in terms of $x$ and $\theta$ as $(x,f(x) \cos(\theta), f(x) \sin(\theta))$. If instead we revolve the curve around the y-axis, then the curve is described by $y = f(\sqrt{x^2+z^2})$, yielding the expression $(x \cos(\theta), f(x), x \sin(\theta))$ in terms of the parameters $x$ and $\theta$.

If x and y are defined in terms of a parameter $t$, then we obtain a parametrization in terms of $t$ and $\theta$. If $x$ and $y$ are functions of $t$, then the surface of revolution obtained by revolving the curve around the x-axis is described by $(x(t),y(t)\cos(\theta), y(t)\sin(\theta))$, and the surface of revolution obtained by revolving the curve around the y-axis is described by $(x(t)\cos(\theta),y(t),x(t)\sin(\theta) )$.

== Geodesics ==
Meridians are always geodesics on a surface of revolution. Other geodesics are governed by Clairaut's relation.

== Toroids ==
A toroid generated from a square

A surface of revolution with a hole in, where the axis of revolution does not intersect the surface, is called a toroid. For example, when a rectangle is rotated around an axis parallel to one of its edges, then a hollow square-section ring is produced. If the revolved figure is a circle, then the object is called a torus.

== See also ==
- Channel surface, a generalisation of a surface of revolution
- Cylindrical symmetry
- Gabriel's Horn
- Generalized helicoid
- Lemon (geometry), surface of revolution of a circular arc
- Liouville surface, another generalization of a surface of revolution
- Spheroid
- Surface integral
- Translation surface (differential geometry)
