= Liouville surface =

In the mathematical field of differential geometry a Liouville surface (named after Joseph Liouville) is a type of surface which in local coordinates may be written as a graph in R^{3}

$$z=f(x,y)$$

such that the first fundamental form is of the form

$$ds^2 = \big(f_1(x) + f_2(y)\big)\left(dx^2+dy^2\right).$$

Sometimes a metric of this form is called a Liouville metric. Every surface of revolution is a Liouville surface.

Darboux gives a general treatment of such surfaces considering a two-dimensional space $(u,v)$ with metric

$$ds^2 = (U-V)(U_1^2\,du^2 + V_1^2\,dv^2),$$

where $U$ and $U_1$ are functions of $u$ and $V$ and $V_1$ are functions of $v$. A geodesic line on such a surface is given by

$$\frac{U_1\,du}{\sqrt{U-\alpha}} - \frac{V_1\,dv}{\sqrt{\alpha-V}} = 0$$

and the distance along the geodesic is given by

$$ds = \frac{UU_1\,du}{\sqrt{U-\alpha}} - \frac{VV_1\,dv}{\sqrt{\alpha-V}}.$$

Here $\alpha$ is a constant related to the direction of the geodesic by

$$\alpha = U\sin^2\omega + V\cos^2\omega,$$

where $\omega$ is the angle of the geodesic measured from a line of constant $v$. In this way, the solution of geodesics on Liouville surfaces is reduced to quadrature. This was first demonstrated by Jacobi for the case of geodesics on a triaxial ellipsoid, a special case of a Liouville surface.
