= Generatrix =

Geometric object moved along a path to generate a shape

In geometry, a generatrix (/dʒɛnəˈreɪtrɪks/) or describent is a point, curve or surface that, when moved along a given path, generates a new shape. The path directing the motion of the generatrix motion is called a directrix or dirigent.

== Examples ==
A cone can be generated by moving a line (the generatrix) fixed at the future apex of the cone along a closed curve (the directrix); if that directrix is a circle perpendicular to the line connecting its center to the apex, the motion is rotation around a fixed axis and the resulting shape is a circular cone.

The generatrix of a cylinder, a limiting case of a cone, is a line that is kept parallel to some axis.

== See also ==
- Surface of revolution
