= Lie sphere geometry =

Geometry founded on spheres

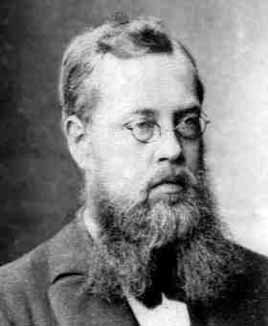
Sophus Lie, the originator of Lie sphere geometry and the line-sphere correspondence.

Lie sphere geometry is a geometrical theory of planar or spatial geometry in which the fundamental concept is the circle or sphere. It was introduced by Sophus Lie in the nineteenth century. The main idea which leads to Lie sphere geometry is that lines (or planes) should be regarded as circles (or spheres) of infinite radius and that points in the plane (or space) should be regarded as circles (or spheres) of zero radius.

The space of circles in the plane (or spheres in space), including points and lines (or planes) turns out to be a manifold known as the Lie quadric (a quadric hypersurface in projective space). Lie sphere geometry is the geometry of the Lie quadric and the Lie transformations which preserve it. This geometry can be difficult to visualize because Lie transformations do not preserve points in general: points can be transformed into circles (or spheres).

To handle this, curves in the plane and surfaces in space are studied using their contact lifts, which are determined by their tangent spaces. This provides a natural realisation of the osculating circle to a curve, and the curvature spheres of a surface. It also allows for a natural treatment of Dupin cyclides and a conceptual solution of the problem of Apollonius.

Lie sphere geometry can be defined in any dimension, but the case of the plane and 3-dimensional space are the most important. In the latter case, Lie noticed a remarkable similarity between the Lie quadric of spheres in 3-dimensions, and the space of lines in 3-dimensional projective space, which is also a quadric hypersurface in a 5-dimensional projective space, called the Plücker or Klein quadric. This similarity led Lie to his famous "line-sphere correspondence" between the space of lines and the space of spheres in 3-dimensional space.

== Basic concepts ==
The key observation that leads to Lie sphere geometry is that theorems of Euclidean geometry in the plane (resp. in space) which only depend on the concepts of circles (resp. spheres) and their tangential contact have a more natural formulation in a more general context in which circles, lines and points (resp. spheres, planes and points) are treated on an equal footing. This is achieved in three steps. First an ideal point at infinity is added to Euclidean space so that lines (or planes) can be regarded as circles (or spheres) passing through the point at infinity (i.e., having infinite radius). This extension is known as inversive geometry with automorphisms known as "Mobius transformations". Second, points are regarded as circles (or spheres) of zero radius. Finally, for technical reasons, the circles (or spheres), including the lines (or planes) are given orientations.

These objects, i.e., the points, oriented circles and oriented lines in the plane, or the points, oriented spheres and oriented planes in space, are sometimes called cycles or Lie cycles. It turns out that they form a quadric hypersurface in a projective space of dimension 4 or 5, which is known as the Lie quadric. The natural symmetries of this quadric form a group of transformations known as the Lie transformations. These transformations do not preserve points in general: they are transforms of the Lie quadric, not of the plane/sphere plus point at infinity. The point-preserving transformations are precisely the Möbius transformations. The Lie transformations which fix the ideal point at infinity are the Laguerre transformations of Laguerre geometry. These two subgroups generate the group of Lie transformations, and their intersection are the Möbius transforms that fix the ideal point at infinity, namely the affine conformal maps.

These groups also have a direct physical interpretation: As pointed out by Harry Bateman, the Lie sphere transformations are identical with the spherical wave transformations that leave the form of Maxwell's equations invariant. In addition, Élie Cartan, Henri Poincaré and Wilhelm Blaschke pointed out that the Laguerre group is simply isomorphic to the Lorentz group of special relativity (see Laguerre group isomorphic to Lorentz group). Eventually, there is also an isomorphism between the Möbius group and the Lorentz group (see Möbius group#Lorentz transformation).

== Lie sphere geometry in the plane ==
=== The Lie quadric ===
The Lie quadric of the plane is defined as follows. Let R^{3,2} denote the space R^{5} of 5-tuples of real numbers, equipped with the signature (3,2) symmetric bilinear form defined by

$$(x_0,x_1,x_2,x_3,x_4)\cdot (y_0,y_1,y_2,y_3,y_4) = - x_0 y_0 - x_1 y_1 + x_2 y_2 + x_3 y_4 + x_4 y_3.$$

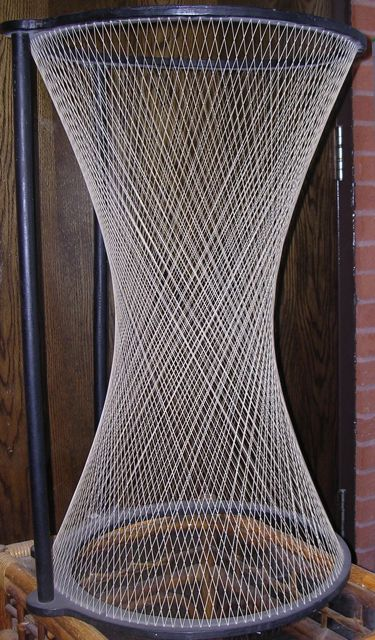
A ruled hyperboloid is a 2-dimensional analogue of the Lie quadric.

The projective space RP^{4} is the space of lines through the origin in R^{5} and is the space of nonzero vectors x in R^{5} up to scale, where x= (x_{0},x_{1},x_{2},x_{3},x_{4}). The planar Lie quadric Q consists of the points [x] in projective space represented by vectors x with x · x = 0.

To relate this to planar geometry it is necessary to fix an oriented timelike line. The chosen coordinates suggest using the point [1,0,0,0,0] ∈ RP^{4}. Any point in the Lie quadric Q can then be represented by a vector x = λ(1,0,0,0,0) + v, where v is orthogonal to (1,0,0,0,0). Since [x] ∈ Q, v · v = λ^{2} ≥ 0.

The orthogonal space to (1,0,0,0,0), intersected with the Lie quadric, is the two dimensional celestial sphere S in Minkowski space-time. This is the Euclidean plane with an ideal point at infinity, which we take to be [0,0,0,0,1]: the finite points (x,y) in the plane are then represented by the points [v] = [0,x,y, −1, (x^{2}+y^{2})/2]; note that v · v = 0, v · (1,0,0,0,0) = 0 and v · (0,0,0,0,1) = −1.

Hence points x = λ(1,0,0,0,0) + v on the Lie quadric with λ = 0 correspond to points in the Euclidean plane with an ideal point at infinity. On the other hand, points x with λ nonzero correspond to oriented circles (or oriented lines, which are circles through infinity) in the Euclidean plane. This is easier to see in terms of the celestial sphere S: the circle corresponding to [λ(1,0,0,0,0) + v] ∈ Q (with λ ≠ 0) is the set of points y ∈ S with y · v = 0. The circle is oriented because v/λ has a definite sign; [−λ(1,0,0,0,0) + v] represents the same circle with the opposite orientation. Thus the isometric reflection map x → x + 2 (x · (1,0,0,0,0)) (1,0,0,0,0) induces an involution ρ of the Lie quadric which reverses the orientation of circles and lines, and fixes the points of the plane (including infinity).

To summarize: there is a one-to-one correspondence between points on the Lie quadric and cycles in the plane, where a cycle is either an oriented circle (or straight line) or a point in the plane (or the point at infinity); the points can be thought of as circles of radius zero, but they are not oriented.

=== Incidence of cycles ===
Suppose two cycles are represented by points [x], [y] ∈ Q. Then x · y = 0 if and only if the corresponding cycles "kiss", that is they meet each other with oriented first order contact. If [x] ∈ S ≅ R^{2} ∪ {∞}, then this just means that [x] lies on the circle corresponding to [y]; this case is immediate from the definition of this circle (if [y] corresponds to a point circle then x · y = 0 if and only if [x] = [y]).

It therefore remains to consider the case that neither [x] nor [y] are in S. Without loss of generality, we can then take x= (1,0,0,0,0) + v and y = (1,0,0,0,0) + w, where v and w are spacelike unit vectors in (1,0,0,0,0)^{⊥}. Thus v^{⊥} ∩ (1,0,0,0,0)^{⊥} and w^{⊥} ∩ (1,0,0,0,0)^{⊥} are signature (2,1) subspaces of (1,0,0,0,0)^{⊥}. They therefore either coincide or intersect in a 2-dimensional subspace. In the latter case, the 2-dimensional subspace can either have signature (2,0), (1,0), (1,1), in which case the corresponding two circles in S intersect in zero, one or two points respectively. Hence they have first order contact if and only if the 2-dimensional subspace is degenerate (signature (1,0)), which holds if and only if the span of v and w is degenerate. By Lagrange's identity, this holds if and only if (v · w)^{2} = (v · v)(w · w) = 1, i.e., if and only if v · w = ± 1, i.e., x · y = 1 ± 1. The contact is oriented if and only if v · w = – 1, i.e., x · y = 0.

=== The problem of Apollonius ===
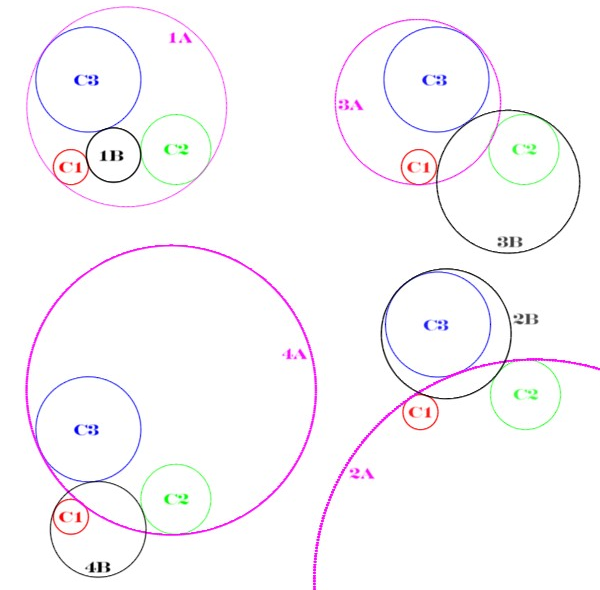
The eight solutions of the generic Apollonian problem. The three given circles are labeled C1, C2 and C3 and colored red, green and blue, respectively. The solutions are arranged in four pairs, with one pink and one black solution circle each, labeled as 1A/1B, 2A/2B, 3A/3B, and 4A/4B. Each pair makes oriented contact with C1, C2, and C3, for a suitable choice of orientations; there are four such choices up to an overall orientation reversal.

The incidence of cycles in Lie sphere geometry provides a simple solution to the problem of Apollonius. This problem concerns a configuration of three distinct circles (which may be points or lines): the aim is to find every other circle (including points or lines) which is tangent to all three of the original circles. For a generic configuration of circles, there are at most eight such tangent circles.

The solution, using Lie sphere geometry, proceeds as follows. Choose an orientation for each of the three circles (there are eight ways to do this, but there are only four up to reversing the orientation of all three). This defines three points [x], [y], [z] on the Lie quadric Q. By the incidence of cycles, a solution to the Apollonian problem compatible with the chosen orientations is given by a point [q] ∈ Q such that q is orthogonal to x, y and z. If these three vectors are linearly dependent, then the corresponding points [x], [y], [z] lie on a line in projective space. Since a nontrivial quadratic equation has at most two solutions, this line actually lies in the Lie quadric, and any point [q] on this line defines a cycle incident with [x], [y] and [z]. Thus there are infinitely many solutions in this case.

If instead x, y and z are linearly independent then the subspace V orthogonal to all three is 2-dimensional. It can have signature (2,0), (1,0), or (1,1), in which case there are zero, one or two solutions for [q] respectively. (The signature cannot be (0,1) or (0,2) because it is orthogonal to a space containing more than one null line.) In the case that the subspace has signature (1,0), the unique solution q lies in the span of x, y and z.

The general solution to the Apollonian problem is obtained by reversing orientations of some of the circles, or equivalently, by considering the triples (x,ρ(y),z), (x,y,ρ(z)) and (x,ρ(y),ρ(z)).

Note that the triple (ρ(x),ρ(y),ρ(z)) yields the same solutions as (x,y,z), but with an overall reversal of orientation. Thus there are at most 8 solution circles to the Apollonian problem unless all three circles meet tangentially at a single point, when there are infinitely many solutions.

=== Lie transformations ===
Any element of the group O(3,2) of orthogonal transformations of R^{3,2} maps any one-dimensional subspace of null vectors in R^{3,2} to another such subspace. Hence the group O(3,2) acts on the Lie quadric. These transformations of cycles are called "Lie transformations". They preserve the incidence relation between cycles. The action is transitive and so all cycles are Lie equivalent. In particular, points are not preserved by general Lie transformations. The subgroup of Lie transformations preserving the point cycles is essentially the subgroup of orthogonal transformations which preserve the chosen timelike direction. This subgroup is isomorphic to the group O(3,1) of Möbius transformations of the sphere. It can also be characterized as the centralizer of the involution ρ, which is itself a Lie transformation.

Lie transformations can often be used to simplify a geometrical problem, by transforming circles into lines or points.

=== Contact elements and contact lifts ===
The fact that Lie transformations do not preserve points in general can also be a hindrance to understanding Lie sphere geometry. In particular, the notion of a curve is not Lie invariant. This difficulty can be mitigated by the observation that there is a Lie invariant notion of contact element.

An oriented contact element in the plane is a pair consisting of a point and an oriented (i.e., directed) line through that point. The point and the line are incident cycles. The key observation is that the set of all cycles incident with both the point and the line is a Lie invariant object: in addition to the point and the line, it consists of all the circles which make oriented contact with the line at the given point. It is called a pencil of Lie cycles, or simply a contact element.

Note that the cycles are all incident with each other as well. In terms of the Lie quadric, this means that a pencil of cycles is a (projective) line lying entirely on the Lie quadric, i.e., it is the projectivization of a totally null two dimensional subspace of R^{3,2}: the representative vectors for the cycles in the pencil are all orthogonal to each other.

The set of all lines on the Lie quadric is a 3-dimensional manifold called the space of contact elements Z^{3}. The Lie transformations preserve the contact elements, and act transitively on Z^{3}. For a given choice of point cycles (the points orthogonal to a chosen timelike vector v), every contact element contains a unique point. This defines a map from Z^{3} to the 2-sphere S^{2} whose fibres are circles. This map is not Lie invariant, as points are not Lie invariant.

Let γ:[a,b] → R^{2} be an oriented curve. Then γ determines a map λ from the interval [a,b] to Z^{3} by sending t to the contact element corresponding to the point γ(t) and the oriented line tangent to the curve at that point (the line in the direction γ '(t)). This map λ is called the contact lift of γ.

In fact Z^{3} is a contact manifold, and the contact structure is Lie invariant. It follows that oriented curves can be studied in a Lie invariant way via their contact lifts, which may be characterized, generically as Legendrian curves in Z^{3}. More precisely, the tangent space to Z^{3} at the point corresponding to a null 2-dimensional subspace π of R^{3,2} is the subspace of those linear maps (A mod π):π → R^{3,2}/π with

A(x) · y + x · A(y) = 0

and the contact distribution is the subspace Hom(π,π^{⊥}/π) of this tangent space in the space Hom(π,R^{3,2}/π) of linear maps.

It follows that an immersed Legendrian curve λ in Z^{3} has a preferred Lie cycle associated to each point on the curve: the derivative of the immersion at t is a 1-dimensional subspace of Hom(π,π^{⊥}/π) where π=λ(t); the kernel of any nonzero element of this subspace is a well defined 1-dimensional subspace of π, i.e., a point on the Lie quadric.

In more familiar terms, if λ is the contact lift of a curve γ in the plane, then the preferred cycle at each point is the osculating circle. In other words, after taking contact lifts, much of the basic theory of curves in the plane is Lie invariant.

== Lie sphere geometry in space and higher dimensions ==
=== General theory ===
Lie sphere geometry in n-dimensions is obtained by replacing R^{3,2} (corresponding to the Lie quadric in n = 2 dimensions) by R^{n + 1, 2}. This is R^{n + 3} equipped with the symmetric bilinear form

$(x_0,x_1,\ldots x_n,x_{n+1},x_{n+2})\cdot (y_0,y_1,\ldots y_n,y_{n+1},y_{n+2})$

$$= - x_0 y_0 + x_1 y_1 + \cdots + x_n y_n + x_{n+1} y_{n+2} + x_{n+2} y_{n+1}.$$

The Lie quadric Q_{n} is again defined as the set of [x] ∈ RP^{n+2} = P(R^{n+1,2}) with x · x = 0. The quadric parameterizes oriented (n − 1)-spheres in n-dimensional space, including hyperplanes and point spheres as limiting cases. Note that Q_{n} is an (n + 1)-dimensional manifold (spheres are parameterized by their center and radius).

The incidence relation carries over without change: the spheres corresponding to points [x], [y] ∈ Q_{n} have oriented first order contact if and only if x · y = 0. The group of Lie transformations is now O(n + 1, 2) and the Lie transformations preserve incidence of Lie cycles.

The space of contact elements is a (2n − 1)-dimensional contact manifold Z^{2n − 1}: in terms of the given choice of point spheres, these contact elements correspond to pairs consisting of a point in n-dimensional space (which may be the point at infinity) together with an oriented hyperplane passing through that point. The space Z^{2n − 1} is therefore isomorphic to the projectivized cotangent bundle of the n-sphere. This identification is not invariant under Lie transformations: in Lie invariant terms, Z^{2n − 1} is the space of (projective) lines on the Lie quadric.

Any immersed oriented hypersurface in n-dimensional space has a contact lift to Z^{2n − 1} determined by its oriented tangent spaces. There is no longer a preferred Lie cycle associated to each point: instead, there are n − 1 such cycles, corresponding to the curvature spheres in Euclidean geometry.

The problem of Apollonius has a natural generalization involving n + 1 hyperspheres in n dimensions.

=== Three dimensions and the line-sphere correspondence ===
In the case n=3, the quadric Q_{3} in P(R^{4,2}) describes the (Lie) geometry of spheres in Euclidean 3-space. Lie noticed a remarkable similarity with the Klein correspondence for lines in 3-dimensional space (more precisely in RP^{3}).

Suppose [x], [y] ∈ RP^{3}, with homogeneous coordinates (x_{0},x_{1},x_{2},x_{3}) and (y_{0},y_{1},y_{2},y_{3}). Put p_{ij} = x_{i}y_{j} − x_{j}y_{i}. These are the homogeneous coordinates of the projective line joining x and y. There are six independent coordinates and they satisfy a single relation, the Plücker relation

p_{01} p_{23} + p_{02} p_{31} + p_{03} p_{12} = 0.

It follows that there is a one-to-one correspondence between lines in RP^{3} and points on the Klein quadric, which is the quadric hypersurface of points [p_{01}, p_{23}, p_{02}, p_{31}, p_{03}, p_{12}] in RP^{5} satisfying the Plücker relation.

The quadratic form defining the Plücker relation comes from a symmetric bilinear form of signature (3,3). In other words, the space of lines in RP^{3} is the quadric in P(R^{3,3}). Although this is not the same as the Lie quadric, a "correspondence" can be defined between lines and spheres using the complex numbers: if x = (x_{0},x_{1},x_{2},x_{3},x_{4},x_{5}) is a point on the (complexified) Lie quadric (i.e., the x_{i} are taken to be complex numbers), then

p_{01} = x_{0} + x_{1}, p_{23} = −x_{0} + x_{1}
p_{02} = x_{2} + ix_{3}, p_{31} = x_{2} − ix_{1}
p_{03} = x_{4} , p_{12} = x_{5}

defines a point on the complexified Klein quadric (where i^{2} = −1).

=== Dupin cyclides ===
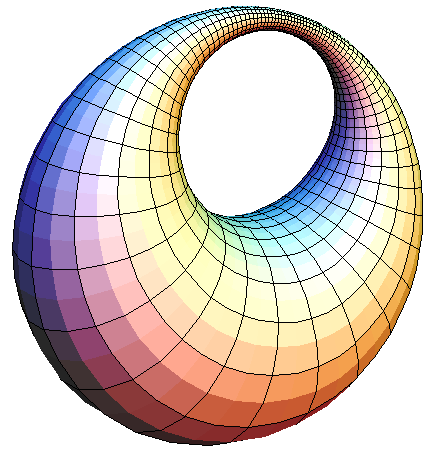
A Dupin cyclide.

Lie sphere geometry provides a natural description of Dupin cyclides. These are characterized as the common envelope of two one parameter families of spheres S(s) and T(t), where S and T are maps from intervals into the Lie quadric. In order for a common envelope to exist, S(s) and T(t) must be incident for all s and t, i.e., their representative vectors must span a null 2-dimensional subspace of R^{4,2}. Hence they define a map into the space of contact elements Z^{5}. This map is Legendrian if and only if the derivatives of S (or T) are orthogonal to T (or S), i.e., if and only if there is an orthogonal decomposition of R^{4,2} into a direct sum of 3-dimensional subspaces σ and τ of signature (2,1), such that S takes values in σ and T takes values in τ. Conversely such a decomposition uniquely determines a contact lift of a surface which envelops two one parameter families of spheres; the image of this contact lift is given by the null 2-dimensional subspaces which intersect σ and τ in a pair of null lines.

Such a decomposition is equivalently given, up to a sign choice, by a symmetric endomorphism of R^{4,2} whose square is the identity and whose ±1 eigenspaces are σ and τ. Using the inner product on R^{4,2}, this is determined by a quadratic form on R^{4,2}.

To summarize, Dupin cyclides are determined by quadratic forms on R^{4,2} such that the associated symmetric endomorphism has square equal to the identity and eigenspaces of signature (2,1).

This provides one way to see that Dupin cyclides are cyclides, in the sense that they are zero-sets of quartics of a particular form. For this, note that as in the planar case, 3-dimensional Euclidean space embeds into the Lie quadric Q_{3} as the set of point spheres apart from the ideal point at infinity. Explicitly, the point (x,y,z) in Euclidean space corresponds to the point

[0, x, y, z, −1, (x^{2} + y^{2} + z^{2})/2]

in Q_{3}. A cyclide consists of the points [0,x_{1},x_{2},x_{3},x_{4},x_{5}] ∈ Q_{3} which satisfy an additional quadratic relation

$$\sum_{i,j=1}^5 a_{ij}  x_i x_j =0$$

for some symmetric 5 × 5 matrix A = (a_{ij}). The class of cyclides is a natural family of surfaces in Lie sphere geometry, and the Dupin cyclides form a natural subfamily.

== See also ==
- Descartes' theorem, also can involve considering a line as a circle with infinite radius.
- Quasi-sphere
