= Cylinder =

Three-dimensional solid

- A right circular cylinder of height h and diameter d=2r
- Type: Smooth surface Algebraic surface
- Euler char.: 2
- Symmetry group: O(2)×O(1)
- Surface area: 2πr(r + h)
- Volume: πr^{2}h

A cylinder (from Ancient Greek κύλινδρος (kúlindros) 'roller, tumbler') has traditionally been a three-dimensional solid, one of the most basic of curvilinear geometric shapes. In elementary geometry, it is considered a prism with a circle as its base.

A cylinder may also be defined as an infinite curvilinear surface in various modern branches of geometry and topology. The shift in the basic meaning—solid versus surface (as in a solid ball versus sphere surface)—has created some ambiguity with terminology. The two concepts may be distinguished by referring to solid cylinders and cylindrical surfaces. In the literature the unadorned term "cylinder" could refer to either of these or to an even more specialized object, the right circular cylinder.

== Types ==
A cylindrical surface is a surface consisting of all the points on all the lines which are parallel to a given line and which pass through a fixed plane curve in a plane not parallel to the given line. Any line in this family of parallel lines is called an element of the cylindrical surface. From a kinematics point of view, given a plane curve, called the directrix, a cylindrical surface is that surface traced out by a line, called the generatrix, not in the plane of the directrix, moving parallel to itself and always passing through the directrix. Any particular position of the generatrix is an element of the cylindrical surface.

A right and an oblique circular cylinder

A solid bounded by a cylindrical surface and two parallel planes is called a (solid) cylinder. The line segments determined by an element of the cylindrical surface between the two parallel planes are called an element of the cylinder. All the elements of a cylinder have equal lengths. The region bounded by the cylindrical surface in either of the parallel planes is called a base of the cylinder. The two bases of a cylinder are congruent figures. If the elements of the cylinder are perpendicular to the planes containing the bases, the cylinder is a right cylinder, otherwise it is called an oblique cylinder. If the bases are disks (regions whose boundary is a circle) the cylinder is called a circular cylinder. In some elementary treatments, a cylinder always means a circular cylinder. An open cylinder is a cylindrical surface without the bases.

The height (or altitude) of a cylinder is the perpendicular distance between its bases.

The cylinder obtained by rotating a line segment about a fixed line that it is parallel to is a cylinder of revolution. A cylinder of revolution is a right circular cylinder. The height of a cylinder of revolution is the length of the generating line segment. The line that the segment is revolved about is called the axis of the cylinder and it passes through the centers of the two bases.

A right circular cylinder with radius r and height h

=== Right circular cylinders ===
The bare term cylinder often refers to a solid cylinder with circular ends perpendicular to the axis, that is, a right circular cylinder, as shown in the figure. The cylindrical surface without the ends is called an open cylinder. The formulae for the surface area and the volume of a right circular cylinder have been known from early antiquity.

A right circular cylinder can also be thought of as the solid of revolution generated by rotating a rectangle about one of its sides. These cylinders are used in an integration technique (the "disk method") for obtaining volumes of solids of revolution.

A tall and thin needle cylinder has a height much greater than its diameter, whereas a short and wide disk cylinder has a diameter much greater than its height.

== Properties ==
=== Cylindric sections ===
Cylindric section

A cylindric section is the intersection of a cylinder's surface with a plane. They are, in general, curves and are special types of plane sections. The cylindric section by a plane that contains two elements of a cylinder is a parallelogram. Such a cylindric section of a right cylinder is a rectangle.

A cylindric section in which the intersecting plane intersects and is perpendicular to all the elements of the cylinder is called a right section. If a right section of a cylinder is a circle then the cylinder is a circular cylinder. In more generality, if a right section of a cylinder is a conic section (parabola, ellipse, hyperbola) then the solid cylinder is said to be parabolic, elliptic and hyperbolic, respectively.

Cylindric sections of a right circular cylinder

For a right circular cylinder, there are several ways in which planes can meet a cylinder. First, planes that intersect a base in at most one point. A plane is tangent to the cylinder if it meets the cylinder in a single element. The right sections are circles and all other planes intersect the cylindrical surface in an ellipse. If a plane intersects a base of the cylinder in exactly two points then the line segment joining these points is part of the cylindric section. If such a plane contains two elements, it has a rectangle as a cylindric section, otherwise the sides of the cylindric section are portions of an ellipse. Finally, if a plane contains more than two points of a base, it contains the entire base and the cylindric section is a circle.

In the case of a right circular cylinder with a cylindric section that is an ellipse, the eccentricity e of the cylindric section and semi-major axis a of the cylindric section depend on the radius of the cylinder r and the angle α between the secant plane and cylinder axis, in the following way:
$$\begin{align}
e &= \cos\alpha, \\[1ex]
a &= \frac{r}{\sin\alpha}.
\end{align}$$

=== Volume ===
If the base of a circular cylinder has a radius r and the cylinder has height h, then its volume is given by
$$V = \pi r^2h$$

This formula holds whether or not the cylinder is a right cylinder.

This formula may be established by using Cavalieri's principle.

A solid elliptic right cylinder with the semi-axes a and b for the base ellipse and height h

In more generality, by the same principle, the volume of any cylinder is the product of the area of a base and the height. For example, an elliptic cylinder with a base having semi-major axis a, semi-minor axis b and height h has a volume V = Ah, where A is the area of the base ellipse (= πab). This result for right elliptic cylinders can also be obtained by integration, where the axis of the cylinder is taken as the positive x-axis and A(x) = A the area of each elliptic cross-section, thus:
$$V = \int_0^h A(x) dx = \int_0^h \pi ab dx = \pi ab \int_0^h dx = \pi a b h.$$

Using cylindrical coordinates, the volume of a right circular cylinder can be calculated by integration
$$\begin{align}
V &= \int_0^h \int_0^{2\pi} \int_0^r s \,\, ds \, d\phi \, dz \\[5mu]
&= \pi\,r^2\,h.
\end{align}$$

=== Surface area ===
Having radius r and altitude (height) h, the surface area of a right circular cylinder, oriented so that its axis is vertical, consists of three parts:

- the area of the top base: πr^{2}
- the area of the bottom base: πr^{2}
- the area of the side: 2πrh

The area of the top and bottom bases is the same, and is called the base area, B. The area of the side is known as the lateral area, L.

An open cylinder does not include either top or bottom elements, and therefore has surface area (lateral area)
$$L = 2 \pi r h$$

The surface area of the solid right circular cylinder is made up the sum of all three components: top, bottom and side. Its surface area is therefore
$$A = L + 2B = 2\pi rh + 2\pi r^2 = 2 \pi r (h + r) = \pi d (r + h)$$
where d = 2r is the diameter of the circular top or bottom.

For a given volume, the right circular cylinder with the smallest surface area has h = 2r. Equivalently, for a given surface area, the right circular cylinder with the largest volume has h = 2r, that is, the cylinder fits snugly in a cube of side length = altitude ( = diameter of base circle).

The lateral area, L, of a circular cylinder, which need not be a right cylinder, is more generally given by
$$L = e \times p,$$
where e is the length of an element and p is the perimeter of a right section of the cylinder. This produces the previous formula for lateral area when the cylinder is a right circular cylinder.

=== Right circular hollow cylinder (cylindrical shell) ===
Hollow cylinder

A right circular hollow cylinder (or cylindrical shell) is a three-dimensional region bounded by two right circular cylinders having the same axis and two parallel annular bases perpendicular to the cylinders' common axis, as in the diagram.

Let the height be h, internal radius r, and external radius R. The volume is given by subtracting the volume of the inner imaginary cylinder (i.e. hollow space) from the volume of the outer cylinder:
$$V = \pi \left( R ^2 - r ^2 \right) h
= 2 \pi \left ( \frac{R + r}{2} \right) h (R - r).$$
Thus, the volume of a cylindrical shell equals 2π × average radius × height × thickness.

The surface area, including the top and bottom, is given by
$$A = 2 \pi \left( R + r \right) h + 2 \pi \left( R^2  - r^2 \right).$$
Cylindrical shells are used in a common integration technique for finding volumes of solids of revolution.

=== On the Sphere and Cylinder ===
A sphere has 2/3 the volume and surface area of its circumscribing cylinder including its bases

In the treatise by this name, written c. 225 BCE, Archimedes obtained the result of which he was most proud, namely obtaining the formulas for the volume and surface area of a sphere by exploiting the relationship between a sphere and its circumscribed right circular cylinder of the same height and diameter. The sphere has a volume two-thirds that of the circumscribed cylinder and a surface area two-thirds that of the cylinder (including the bases). Since the values for the cylinder were already known, he obtained, for the first time, the corresponding values for the sphere. The volume of a sphere of radius r is 4/3πr^{3} = 2/3 (2πr^{3}). The surface area of this sphere is 4πr^{2} = 2/3 (6πr^{2}). A sculpted sphere and cylinder were placed on the tomb of Archimedes at his request.

== Cylindrical surfaces ==
In some areas of geometry and topology the term cylinder refers to what has been called a cylindrical surface. A cylinder is defined as a surface consisting of all the points on all the lines which are parallel to a given line and which pass through a fixed plane curve in a plane not parallel to the given line. Such cylinders have, at times, been referred to as generalized cylinders. Through each point of a generalized cylinder there passes a unique line that is contained in the cylinder. Thus, this definition may be rephrased to say that a cylinder is any ruled surface spanned by a one-parameter family of parallel lines.

A cylinder having a right section that is an ellipse, parabola, or hyperbola is called an elliptic cylinder, parabolic cylinder and hyperbolic cylinder, respectively. These are degenerate quadric surfaces.

Parabolic cylinder

When the principal axes of a quadric are aligned with the reference frame (always possible for a quadric), a general equation of the quadric in three dimensions is given by
$$f(x,y,z)=Ax^2 + By^2 + C z^2 + Dx + Ey + Gz + H = 0,$$
with the coefficients being real numbers and not all of A, B and C being 0. If at least one variable does not appear in the equation, then the quadric is degenerate. If one variable is missing, we may assume by an appropriate rotation of axes that the variable z does not appear and the general equation of this type of degenerate quadric can be written as
$$A \left ( x + \frac{D}{2A} \right )^2 + B \left(y + \frac{E}{2B} \right)^2 = \rho,$$
where
$$\rho = -H + \frac{D^2}{4A} + \frac{E^2}{4B}.$$

=== Elliptic cylinder ===
If AB > 0 this is the equation of an elliptic cylinder. Further simplification can be obtained by translation of axes and scalar multiplication. If $\rho$ has the same sign as the coefficients A and B, then the equation of an elliptic cylinder may be rewritten in Cartesian coordinates as:
$$\left(\frac{x}{a}\right)^2+ \left(\frac{y}{b}\right)^2 = 1.$$
This equation of an elliptic cylinder is a generalization of the equation of the ordinary, circular cylinder (a = b). Elliptic cylinders are also known as cylindroids, but that name is ambiguous, as it can also refer to the Plücker conoid.

If $\rho$ has a different sign than the coefficients, we obtain the imaginary elliptic cylinders:
$$\left(\frac{x}{a}\right)^2 + \left(\frac{y}{b}\right)^2 = -1,$$
which have no real points on them. ($\rho = 0$ gives a single real point.)

=== Hyperbolic cylinder ===
If A and B have different signs and $\rho \neq 0$, we obtain the hyperbolic cylinders, whose equations may be rewritten as:
$$\left(\frac{x}{a}\right)^2 - \left(\frac{y}{b}\right)^2 = 1.$$

=== Parabolic cylinder ===
Finally, if AB = 0 assume, without loss of generality, that B = 0 and A = 1 to obtain the parabolic cylinders with equations that can be written as:
$$x^2 + 2 a y = 0 .$$

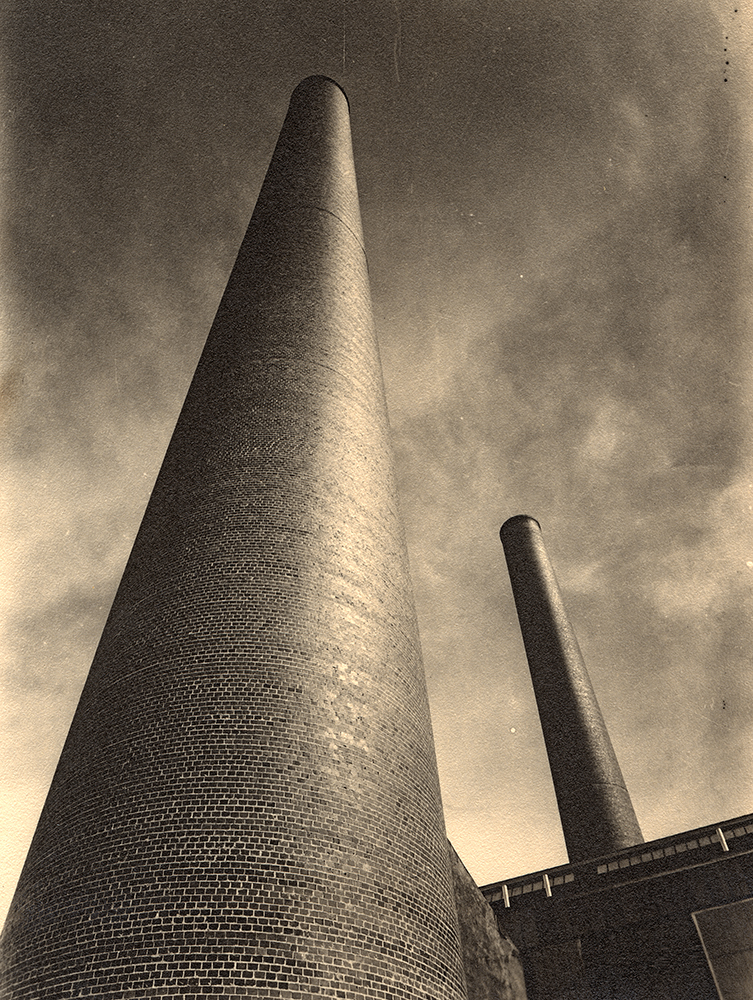
In projective geometry, a cylinder is simply a cone whose apex is at infinity, which corresponds visually to a cylinder in perspective appearing to be a cone towards the sky.

== Projective geometry ==
In projective geometry, a cylinder is simply a cone whose apex (vertex) lies on the plane at infinity. If the cone is a quadratic cone, the plane at infinity (which passes through the vertex) can intersect the cone at two real lines, a single real line (actually a coincident pair of lines), or only at the vertex. These cases give rise to the hyperbolic, parabolic or elliptic cylinders respectively.

This concept is useful when considering degenerate conics, which may include the cylindrical conics.

== Prisms ==
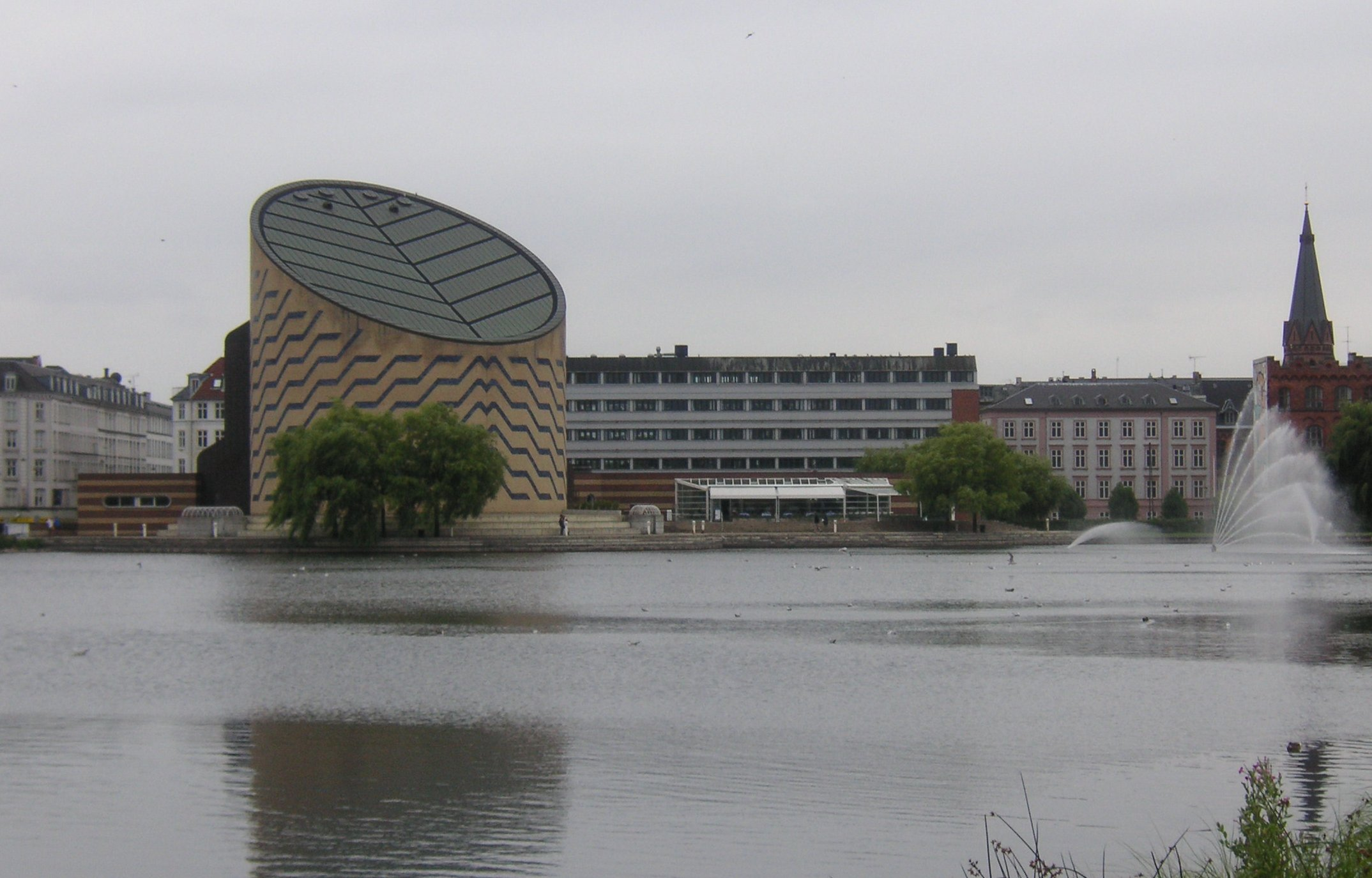
The Tycho Brahe Planetarium in Copenhagen is an example of a truncated cylinder.

A solid circular cylinder can be regarded as the limiting case of a n-gonal prism as n approaches infinity. Because of this close relationship, many earlier geometry texts treat prisms and cylinders together. Standard formulas for the surface area and volume of a cylinder can be derived from the corresponding formulas for prisms by considering inscribed and circumscribed prisms and taking the limit as the number of sides increases without bound.

The focus on circular cylinders in classical treatments arises from the fact that a circular base is the only plane figure for which this limiting argument can be carried out using elementary methods, without relying on calculus. Cylinders and prisms also share parallel terminology: for example, a truncated prism is a prism whose bases do not lie in parallel planes, and by analogy a solid cylinder with non-parallel bases is called a truncated cylinder.

From a polyhedral perspective, a cylinder may also be viewed as the dual of a bicone, interpreted as an infinite-sided bipyramid.

Family of uniform n-gonal prisms
Prism name	Digonal prism	(Trigonal) Triangular prism	(Tetragonal) Square prism	Pentagonal prism	Hexagonal prism	Heptagonal prism	Octagonal prism	Enneagonal prism	Decagonal prism	Hendecagonal prism	Dodecagonal prism	...	Apeirogonal prism
Polyhedron image												...	
Spherical tiling image												Plane tiling image	
Vertex config.	2.4.4	3.4.4	4.4.4	5.4.4	6.4.4	7.4.4	8.4.4	9.4.4	10.4.4	11.4.4	12.4.4	...	∞.4.4
Coxeter diagram												...	

== See also ==
- Lists of shapes
- Steinmetz solid, the intersection of two or three perpendicular cylinders
