= Polycon =

Developable roller constructed from a cone

In geometry, a polycon is a kind of a developable roller. It is made of identical pieces of a cone whose apex angle equals the angle of an even sided regular polygon. In principle, there are infinitely many polycons, as many as there are even sided regular polygons. Most members of the family have elongated spindle like shapes. The polycon family generalizes the sphericon. It was discovered by the Israeli inventor David Hirsch in 2017.

== Construction ==
- Two adjacent edges of an even sided regular polygon are extended till they reach the polygon's axis of symmetry that is furthest from the edges' common vertex.
- By rotating the two resulting line segments around the polygon's axis of symmetry that passes through the common vertex, a right circular cone is created.
- Two planes are passed such that each one of them contains the normal to the polygon at its center point and one of the two distanced vertices of the two edges.
- The cone part that lies between the two planes is replicated $\frac{n}{2}-1$ times, where ${n}$ is the number of the polygon's edges. All $\frac{n}{2}$ parts are joined at their planer surfaces to create a spindle shaped object. It has ${n}$ curved edges which pass through alternating vertices of the polygon.
- The obtained object is cut in half at its plane of symmetry (the polygon's plane).
- The two identical halves are reunited after being rotated at an offset angle of $\frac{2\pi}{n}$

== Edges and vertices ==
A polycon based on a regular polygon with ${n}$ edges has ${n+2}$ vertices, ${n}$ of which coincide with the polygon's vertices, with the remaining two lying at the extreme ends of the solid. It has ${n}$ edges, each one being half of the conic section created where the cone's surface intersects one of the two cutting planes. On each side of the polygonal cross-section, $\frac{n}{2}$ edges of the polycon run (from every second vertex of the polygon) to one of the solid's extreme ends. The edges on one side are offset by an angle of $\frac{2\pi}{n}$ from those on the other side. The edges of the sphericon (${n=4}$) are circular. The edges of the hexacon (${n=6}$) are parabolic. All other polycons' edges are hyperbolic.

== The sphericon as a polycon ==

The sphericon is the first member of the polycon family. It is also a member of the poly-sphericon and the convex hull of the two disc roller (TDR convex hull) families. In each of the families, it is constructed differently. As a poly-sphericon, it is constructed by cutting a bicone with an apex angle of $\frac{\pi}{2}$ at its plane of symmetry and reuniting the two obtained parts after rotating them at an offset angel of $\frac{\pi}{2}$. As a TDR convex hull it is the convex hull of two perpendicular 180° circular sectors joined at their centers. As a polycon, the starting point is a cone created by rotating two adjacent edges of a square around its axis of symmetry that passes through their common vertex. In this specific case there is no need to extend the edges because their ends reach the square's other axis of symmetry. Since, in this specific case, the two cutting planes coincide with the plane of the cone's base, nothing is discarded and the cone remains intact. By creating another identical cone and joining the two cones together using their flat surfaces, a bicone is created. From here the construction continues in the same way described for the construction of the sphericon as a poly-sphericon. The only difference between the sphericon as a poly-sphericon and sphericon as a polycon is that as a poly- sphericon it has four vertices and as a polycon it is considered to have six. The additional vertices are not noticeable because they are located in the middle of the circular edges, and merge with them completely.

== Rolling properties ==
The surface of each polycon is a single developable face. Thus the entire family has rolling properties that are related to the meander motion of the sphericon, as do some members of the poly-sphericon family. Because the polysphericons' surfaces consist of conical surfaces and various kinds of frustum surfaces (conical and/or cylindrical), their rolling properties change whenever each of the surfaces touches the rolling plane. This is not the case with the polycons. Because each one of them is made of only one kind of conical surface the rolling properties remain uniform throughout the entire rolling motion. The instantaneous motion of the polycon is identical to a cone rolling motion around one of its ${n}$ central vertices. The motion, as a whole, is a combination of these motions with each of the vertices serving in turn as an instant center of rotation around which the solid rotates during $\frac{1}{n}$ of the rotation cycle. Once another vertex comes into contact with the rolling surface it becomes the new temporary center of rotation, and the rotation vector flips to the opposite direction. The resulting overall motion is a meander that is linear on average. Each of the two extreme vertices touches the rolling plane, instantaneously, $\frac{n}{2}$ times in one rotation cycle. The instantaneous line of contact between the polycon and the surface it is rolling on is a segment of one of the generatinglines of a cone, and everywhere along this line the tangent plane to the polycon is the same.

When $\frac{n}{2}$ is an odd number this tangent plane is a constant distance from the tangent plane to the generating line on the polycon surface which is instantaneously uppermost. Thus the polycons, for $\frac{n}{2}$ odd, are constant height rollers (as is a right circular bicone, a cylinder or a prism with Reuleaux triangle cross-section). Polycons, for $\frac{n}{2}$ even, don't possess this feature.

== History ==
The sphericon was first introduced by David Hirsch in 1980 in a patent he named 'A Device for Generating a Meander Motion'. The principle, according to which it was constructed, as described in the patent, is consistent with the principle according to which poly-sphericons are constructed. Only more than 25 years later, following Ian Stewart's article about the sphericon in the Scientific American Journal, it was realized both by members of the woodturning [17, 26] and mathematical [16, 20] communities that the same construction method could be generalized to a series of axial-symmetric objects that have regular polygon cross sections other than the square. The surfaces of the bodies obtained by this method (not including the sphericon itself) consist of one kind of conic surface, and one, or more, cylindrical or conical frustum surfaces. In 2017 Hirsch began exploring a different method of generalizing the sphericon, one that is based on a single surface without the use of frustum surfaces. The result of this research was the discovery of the polycon family. The new family was first introduced at the 2019 Bridges Conference in Linz, Austria, both at the art works gallery and at the film festival
