= PC-50x family =

Series of home video game console

- Manufacturer: Several companies; see Consoles list
- Type: Home video game console
- Generation: First generation
- Lifespan: 1977–1982
- Media: ROM cartridge
- CPU: General Instrument AY-3-8xxx

The PC-50x family (also known as SD-050, SD-070, SD-090, 9015) is a series of home video game consoles belonging to the first generation prevalent in Europe between 1977 and the early 1980s, all produced in Asia. The designation PC-50x of the series derives from the serial number of the cartridges (PC-501, PC-502 ...).

The consoles do not have a central processor; all the games are implemented thanks to the individual chips in the cartridges, all based on the chip family AY-3-8xxx of General Instrument. The family also includes the so-called "9015" series in which it changes the name (9015-A, 9015-B ...) and changes the shape of the cartridges but uses the same AY-3-8xxx chips.

== Common features ==
Some consoles produced coloured screens while others were black and white. Of the colour consoles some were marked with the initial letter S of SECAM, the French standard of the colour coding, used for example in France (and colonies) and Russia.

Features common to all the consoles in the family are the 10 keys for choosing the game, a start/reset button, 4/5 switches for game settings and two joystick with one button on each.

For many models, in the name there are the SD letters, which stand for Soundic (Hong Kong), the real manufacturer of the console.

== Consoles list ==
The consoles were produced in China, imported and rebranded by several companies and sold under different names. Below is a non-exhaustive list of them.

Name	Company	Display	Year	Country	Note	Photo
SD 050S	ITMC	Colour		France		
SD 90	ITMC	Black and white or colour		France		
SD 050S	Soundic	Colour		Europe		
Programmable system	Soundic	Black and white		Europe		
TV Jack 5000	Bandai	Colour	1978	Japan		
Palladium Tele-Cassetten Game	Neckermann	Colour	1978	Germany		
Video Cassette Lock	Takatoku	Colour	1977	Japan	(CTV-8600 or TG 95 OI model).	
SD 050	Hanimex	Black and white		Europe		
SD 070 couleur	Hanimex	Colour		Europe		
TVG 070C	Hanimex	Colour		Europe		
Secam Systeme vidéo cassettes	Secam	Colour		France	On the PCB is written SD-050S	
Jeu Video SD 050S	Secam	Colour		France		
SD-50 Program 2000	Creatronic	Colour	1978	France		
Programmable 2003	Elbex	Colour	1977	Europe	Produced in China but sold in Europe	
4/303 'Video Secam System'	Rollet	Colour	1983?	France	Sold also with the name 'Secam Video Systeme' SD-050S	
Programmable TV-Game	Universum	Colour		Germany		
SD-050	Grandstand	Colour		United Kingdom		
Programmable game	Grandstand	Colour		United Kingdom	Also known as Mercury Commander Paul's Mark III – Programmable TV Game	
Colour Programmable SD070; Video Sports Centre SD070	Grandstand	Colour	1978	United Kingdom; United States		
Tournament Colour Programmable 2000	Prinztronic	Colour				
Programmable TV Game SD-050C	Tempest		1977	Austria		
Superstar 01-4354 Programmable	Binatone	Colour	1978	United Kingdom		
Cablestar 01-4354	Binatone	Black and white	1978	United Kingdom		
Tele-Sports III	Radofin	Colour	1978	Europe		
Tele-Sports IV	Radofin; Acetronic	Colour	1978	Europe		
Tele-Sports programmable	Radofin	Colour	1978	Europe		
Colour TV Game	Acetronic	Colour	1978	United Kingdom		
Video SD-050	Akur	Colour	1978	Germany		
Color TVG-872	Cam; Clipper	Colour	1978 (Cam); 1977 (Clipper)	Italy		
TVG-888	Irradio	Colour		Italy		
PG-7 programmable	Polycon	Colour		United Kingdom		
9015	Poppy	Colour		Germany		
TVG 10	Poppy	Colour		Germany		
9015	Sanwa	Colour		Germany		
9015	Mustang	Colour		Germany		
4A-8	Conic	Colour	1978	Hong Kong	Cartridge format in common with 9015	
Jeu Video Cassette Interchangeables Tele-sports III	Univox	Colour	1977	France		
Color (model TVG 57253)	Mark		1978	Europe		
TV Game-programmable SD-070	Tristar		1978	Sweden		
Colour Cartridge VMV12	Videomaster	Colour	1979	United Kingdom	Cartridge format in common with Palson	
Game Cassette System CX-336	Palson	Colour	1978; 1979	Spain	Cartridge format in common with Videomaster	
Aureac Video Play	Aureac VP Electronics		1978	Spain	The 10 game select keys were on one of the two controllers	
Black Point FS 1003	S.H.G. GmbH	Colour	1978	West Germany		
Black Point FS 2000	S.H.G. GmbH	Colour	1978	West Germany		
Optim 600	Optim	Colour	1978	United Kingdom		

== Games ==
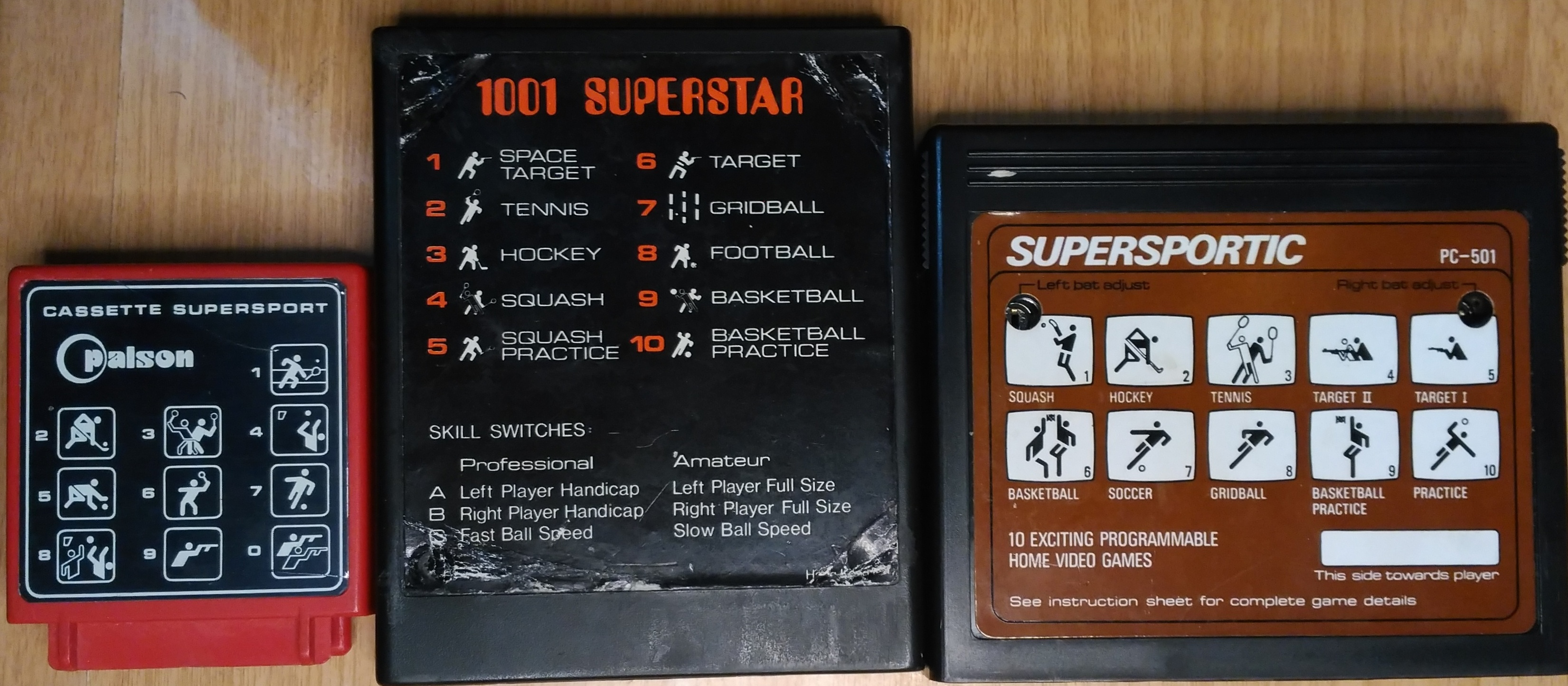
Format difference between Palson CX 336 "Supersport", Radofin Programmable Video System "1001 Superstar" and PC-501 "Supersportic", all with AY-3-8610 inside

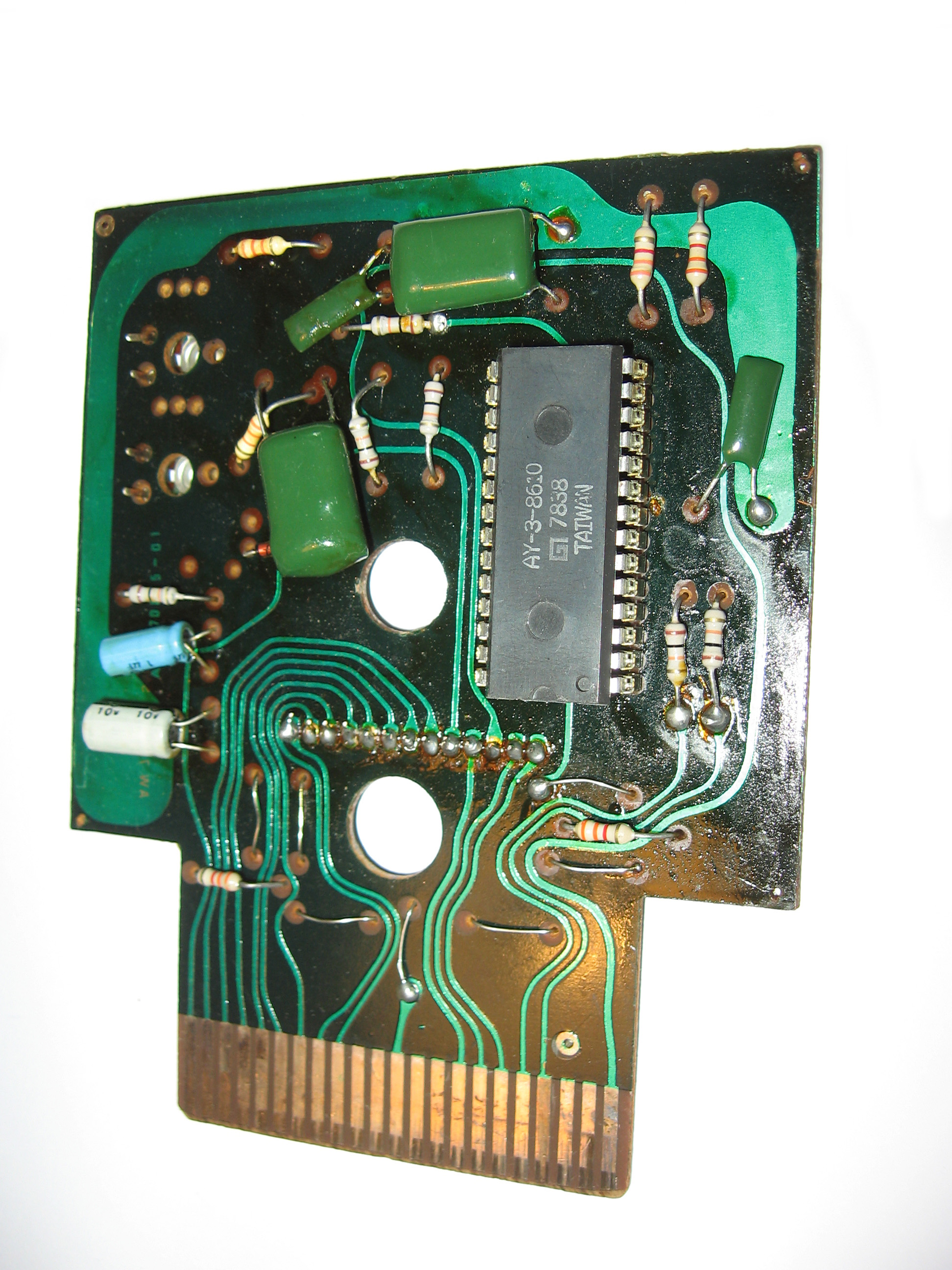
Prinztronic Superstar cartridge interior, based on the AY-3-8610 chip

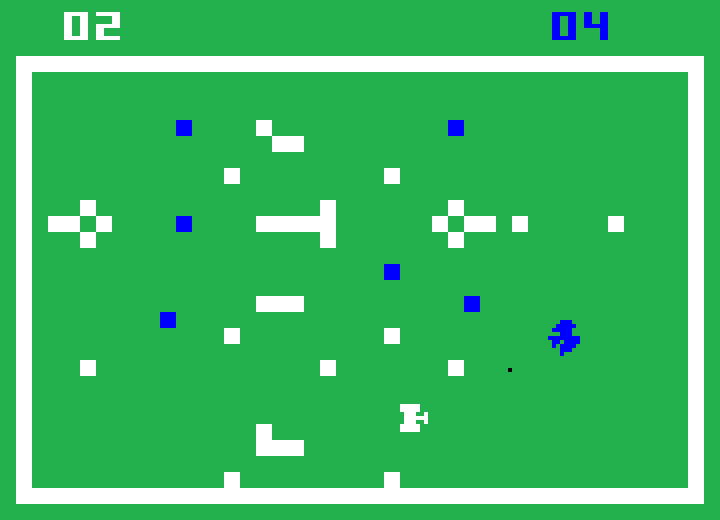
AY-3-8710 (PAL version) Tank Battle

Code	French name	English name	Chip
PC-501; 9015-A	Supersportif	Sports / Supersportic / Superten / Superstar	AY-3-8610 (8 pong games + 2 rifle games)
PC-502; 9015-B	Motocyclette	Motor cycle	AY-3-8760 (4 race games)
PC-503; 9015-C	Bataille de chars	Tank Battle	AY-3-8710 (2 tank games)
PC-504; 9015-D	Course de voitures GP	Racing cars / Grand Prix / Race Car GP	AY-3-8603 (2 racing games)
PC-505; 9015-G	Bataille navale	Submarine	AY-3-8605 (2 games)
PC-506; 9015-E	Jeu de destruction	Super Wipeout	AY-3-8606 (10 games)
PC-507; 9015-H	Jeux de tir	Shooting Gallery	AY-3-8607 (3 rifle games)
PC-508; 9015-F?	6 jeux de base	Fundamental	AY-3-8500 (pong games)
