= Developable roller =

Convex solid with a continuous, developable surface

STL model of a sphericon

In geometry, a developable roller is a convex solid whose surface consists of a single continuous, developable face. While rolling on a plane, most developable rollers develop their entire surface so that all the points on the surface touch the rolling plane. All developable rollers have ruled surfaces. Four families of developable rollers have been described to date: the prime polysphericons, the convex hulls of the two disc rollers (TDR convex hulls), the polycons and the Platonicons.

== Construction ==
Comparison of an oloid (left) and sphericon (right) — in the SVG image, move over the image to rotate the shapes

Each developable roller family is based on a different construction principle. The prime polysphericons are a subfamily of the polysphericon family. They are based on bodies made by rotating regular polygons around one of their longest diagonals. These bodies are cut in two at their symmetry plane and the two halves are reunited after being rotated at an offset angle relative to each other. All prime polysphericons have two edges made of one or more circular arcs and four vertices. All of them, but the sphericon, have surfaces that consist of one kind of conic surface and one, or more, conical or cylindrical frustum surfaces. Two-disc rollers are made of two congruent symmetrical circular or elliptical sectors. The sectors are joined to each other such that the planes in which they lie are perpendicular to each other, and their axes of symmetry coincide. The convex hulls of these structures constitute the members of the TDR convex hull family. All members of this family have two edges (the two circular or elliptical arcs). They may have either 4 vertices, as in the sphericon (which is a member of this family as well) or none, as in the oloid. Like the prime polysphericons the polycons are based on regular polygons but consist of identical pieces of only one type of cone with no frustum parts. The cone is created by rotating two adjacent edges of a regular polygon (and in most cases their extensions as well) around the polygon's axis of symmetry that passes through their common vertex. A polycon based on an n-gon (a polygon with n edges) has n edges and n + 2 vertices. The sphericon, which is a member of this family as well, has circular edges. The hexacon's edges are parabolic. All other polycons' edges are hyperbolic. Like the polycons, the Platonicons are made of only one type of conic surface. Their unique feature is that each one of them circumscribes one of the five Platonic solids. Unlike the other families, this family is not infinite. 14 Platonicons have been discovered to date.

== Rolling motion ==
Unlike axially symmetrical bodies that, if unrestricted, can perform a linear rolling motion (like the sphere or the cylinder) or a circular one (like the cone), developable rollers meander while rolling. Their motion is linear only on average. In the case of the polycons and Platonicons, as well as some of the prime polysphericons, the path of their center of mass consists of circular arcs. In the case of the prime polysphericons that have surfaces that contain cylindrical parts the path is a combination of circular arcs and straight lines. A general expression for the shape of the path of the TDR convex hulls center of mass has yet to be derived. In order to maintain a smooth rolling motion the center of mass of a rolling body must maintain a constant height. All prime polysphericons, polycons, and platonicons and some of the TDR convex hulls share this property. Some of the TDR convex hulls, like the oloid, do not possess this property. In order for a TDR convex hull to maintain constant height the following must hold:

$$\ c^2=4a^2-2b^2$$

Where a and b are the half minor and major axes of the elliptic arcs, respectively, and c is the distance between their centers. For example, in the case where the skeletal structure of the convex hull TDR consists of two circular segments with radius r, for the center of mass to be kept at constant height, the distance between the sectors' centers should be equal to $\sqrt{2}$r.
