= Oloid =

Three-dimensional curved geometric object

Oloid structure, showing the two 240-degree circular sectors and the convex hull

The plane shape of a developed oloid surface

An oloid is a three-dimensional curved geometric object that was discovered by Paul Schatz in 1929. It is the convex hull of a skeletal frame made by placing two linked congruent circles in perpendicular planes, so that the center of each circle lies on the edge of the other circle. The distance between the circle centers equals the radius of the circles. One third of each circle's perimeter lies inside the convex hull, so the same shape may be also formed as the convex hull of the two remaining circular arcs each spanning an angle of 4π/3.

== Surface area and volume ==
The surface area of an oloid is given by

$$A = 4\pi r^2,$$

exactly the same as the surface area of a sphere with the same radius. In closed form, the enclosed volume is

$$V = \frac{2}{3} \left(2 E\left(\frac{3}{4}\right) + K\left(\frac{3}{4}\right)\right)r^3,$$

where $K$ and $E$ denote the complete elliptic integrals of the first and second kind respectively. A numerical calculation gives

$$V \approx 3.0524184684\,r^3.$$

== Kinetics ==
The surface of the oloid is a developable surface, meaning that patches of the surface can be flattened into a plane. While rolling, it develops its entire surface: every point of the surface of the oloid touches the plane on which it is rolling, at some point during the rolling movement, making it a developable roller. Unlike most axial symmetric objects (cylinder, sphere etc.), while rolling on a flat surface, its center of mass performs a meandering motion rather than a linear one. The distance $h$ between the oloid's center of mass and the rolling surface is given by

$$h = \frac{r\left(2 +\cos t\right)}{2\sqrt{2(1+\cos t)}}$$,

where $t\in\left(-\frac{2 \pi}{3};\frac{2 \pi}{3}\right)$ is the arc-length of one of the circles and $r$ is the radius of the circle. This distance has two minima and two maxima in each rolling cycle. The difference between maxima and minima is

$$\Delta h=r\left(\frac{3}{4}-\frac{\sqrt{2}}{2}\right)\approx 0.0429r$$.

Since this difference is fairly small, the oloid's rolling motion is relatively smooth.

At each point during this rolling motion, the oloid touches the plane in a line segment. The length of this segment stays unchanged throughout the motion, and is given by:

$$l = \sqrt{3} r$$.

== Related shapes ==
Comparison of an oloid (left) and sphericon (right) — in the SVG image, move over the image to rotate the shapes

a navigable 3D oloid

a navigable 3D sphericon

The sphericon is the convex hull of two semicircles on perpendicular planes, with centers at a single point. Its surface consists of the pieces of four cones. It resembles the oloid in shape and, like it, is a developable surface that can be developed by rolling. However, its equator is a square with four sharp corners, unlike the oloid which does not have sharp corners.

A more general object called the two-circle roller was described in 1966. It was defined from joined two perpendicular circular discs. If the distance between their centers is √2 times their radius, then its center of gravity stays at a constant distance from the floor, so it rolls more smoothly than the oloid.

Morton’s Rolling Knot or 'Rocking Knot' is a trefoil knot that has been parametrized in a way that leaves it tritangentless, e.g. with no plane that can be laid tangent to three distinct points. This distinct property means it never touches the ground in more than two places at once and is thus able to roll easily. Modern optimizations have been made to determine the optimum parameters for a homogenous rolling motion.

== In popular culture ==
In 1979, modern dancer Alan Boeding designed his "Circle Walker" sculpture from two crosswise semicircles, forming a skeletal version of the sphericon, a shape with a similar rolling motion to the oloid. He began dancing with a scaled-up version of the sculpture in 1980 as part of an MFA program in sculpture at Indiana University, and after he joined the MOMIX dance company in 1984 the piece became incorporated into the company's performances. The company's later piece "Dream Catcher" is based around another Boeding sculpture whose linked teardrop shapes incorporate the skeleton and rolling motion of the oloid.

== Literature ==
Tobias Langscheid, Tilo Richter (Ed.): Oloid – Form of the Future. With contributions by Dirk Böttcher, Andreas Chiquet, Heinrich Frontzek a.o., niggli Verlag 2023, ISBN 978-3-7212-1025-5
