= Development (differential geometry) =

In classical differential geometry, development is the rolling of one smooth surface over another in Euclidean space. For example, the tangent plane to a surface (such as the sphere or the cylinder) at a point can be rolled around the surface to obtain the tangent plane at other points.

== Properties ==
The tangential contact between the surfaces being rolled over one another provides a relation between points on the two surfaces. If this relation is (perhaps only in a local sense) a bijection between the surfaces, then the two surfaces are said to be developable on each other or developments of each other. Differently put, the correspondence provides an isometry, locally, between the two surfaces.

In particular, if one of the surfaces is a plane, then the other is called a developable surface: thus a developable surface is one which is locally isometric to a plane. The cylinder is developable, but the sphere is not.

== Flat connections ==
Development can be generalized further using flat connections. From this point of view, rolling the tangent plane over a surface defines an affine connection on the surface (it provides an example of parallel transport along a curve), and a developable surface is one for which this connection is flat.

More generally any flat Cartan connection on a manifold defines a development of that manifold onto the model space. Perhaps the most famous example is the development of conformally flat n-manifolds, in which the model-space is the n-sphere. The development of a conformally flat manifold is a conformal local diffeomorphism from the universal cover of the manifold to the n-sphere.

== Undevelopable surfaces ==
The class of double-curved surfaces (undevelopable surfaces) contains objects that cannot be simply unfolded (developed). Such surfaces can be developed only approximately with some distortions of linear surface elements (see the Stretched grid method)

== See also ==
- Developable surface
- Ruled surface
