= Paul Schatz =

German-born sculptor, inventor, and mathematician (1898–1979)

Paul Schatz (22 December 1898, Konstanz – 7 March 1979) was a German-born sculptor, inventor and mathematician who patented the oloid and discovered the inversions of the platonic solids, including the "invertible cube", which is often sold as an eponymous puzzle, the Schatz cube. From 1927 to his death he lived in Switzerland.

== Origins and methodology ==
Paul Schatz's investigations grew out of what he called "serious play", a research motto he summarised in German as suche, was du ungesucht magst finden ("search for what you might find unasked"). This open-ended approach demanded treating familiar forms as if they were unknown, allowing novel patterns to emerge. At that time, Schatz was a trained wood sculptor with university-level mathematical education, and he combined these skills by crafting hand-built paper and wood models to investigate spatial relationships and transformations.

His first challenge was to map the twelve zodiac signs—arranged sequentially in a circle on the plane—onto the twelve faces of a regular dodecahedron (a solid whose twelve faces are identical pentagons). To preserve both the circular order and overall symmetry, Schatz split each pentagon into shell-like segments connected by hinges. This yielded a six-link chain that could fold into various spatial configurations, effectively translating a two-dimensional ring into a three-dimensional form.

Building on this "shell dodecahedron", he successively derived a rhombohedron (a six-faced solid with equal edges but non-right angles), created an intermediate Würfelhocker (a cube-shaped form that momentarily "rests" at two hinge positions), and finally realised a cyclically invertible cube capable of turning inside-out in a single continuous motion. From these kinematic insights he developed the Turbula mixer: by driving a three-link half-chain between two counter-rotating shafts, the device imparts a tumbling motion that counteracts centrifugal separation, improving the homogeneity of powders and fluids. Early commercial machines were manufactured by Bachofen of Muttenz and Bioengineering of Zürich.

== Inversion research ==
Schatz was one of the first to recognise the importance of the concept of Umstülpung (inversion), a dynamic metamorphosis by which a form turns inside out, interchanging its inner and outer surfaces. Using special mobile models of the Platonic solids, he demonstrated that the cube can undergo projective inversion: its faces tip through six joints to form a hollow frame before returning to the original solid in a continuous, cyclical movement. He extended this principle to all regular polyhedra, laying the foundations for what became known as Platonic inversion, and influencing subsequent work by Immo, Franz and Friedemann Sykora, Konrad Schneider and others.

== Technological applications ==
Schatz's inversion models realise a new kinematic category—distinct from translation and rotation—whereby a linkage with a single degree of freedom produces a looping, pulsating motion that rhythmically returns to its start point. He and collaborators showed that only polyhedra admitting such sixfold chains of joints can invert, and they devised prototype mechanisms (for example, the 'pulsina') based on dodecahedral inversion. These ideas directly led to two applications: the turbula, which uses two counter-rotating axes to transfer rotational energy into inversion movement for thorough, non-destructive mixing of powders and fluids; and the oloid, a shape derived from the inversion cycle of the cube, employed as an efficient agitator and aerator in water treatment and laboratory equipment.
