= SHG Black Point FS 1003/FS 2000 =

1982 home video game console

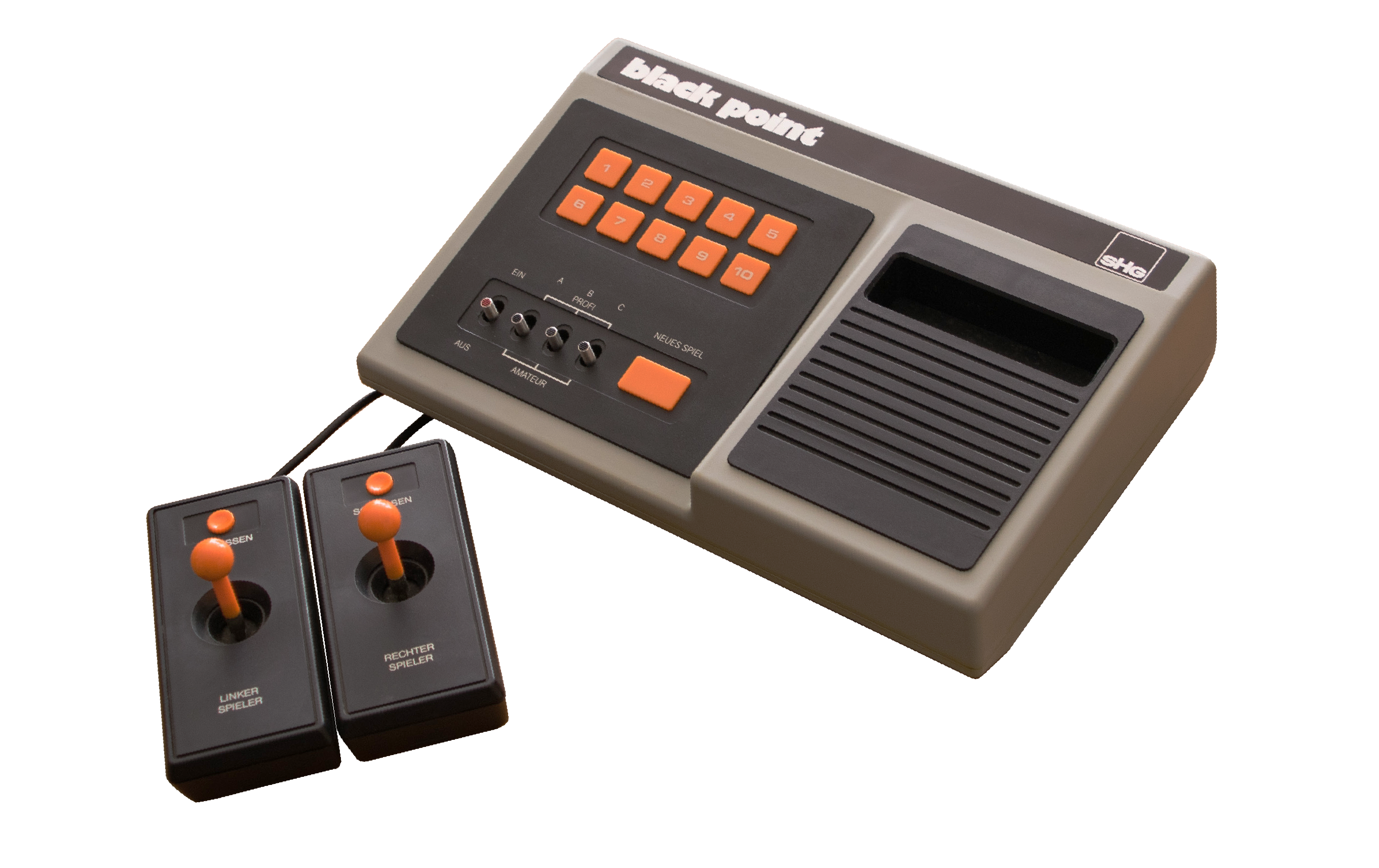
- SHG Black Point FS 1003 and its two controllers
- Also known as: S.H.G. Black Point; Black Point; black point
- Developer: Süddeutsche Elektro-Hausgeräte GmbH & Co. KG
- Manufacturer: Radofin (Hong Kong)
- Product family: PC-50x
- Type: PC-50x home video game console
- Generation: First generation
- Released: Germany: 1982
- Introductory price: 168DM (c. 163€ in 2020)
- System on a chip: N/A (cartridges had a system board on them)
- CPU: N/A
- Memory: N/A
- Graphics: Colored
- Sound: Yes
- Controller input: 2 detachable controllers with one analog stick and fire button each
- Connectivity: RF output
- Power: FS-1003: 15 Volt, 120 mA; FS-2000: 9-11 V, 90 mA or 6 x 1.5 V batteries
- Online services: N/A
- Predecessor: SHG Black Point Multicolor FS 1001
- Website: N/A

The SHG Black Point FS 1003/FS 2000 (also known as S.H.G. Black Point FS 1003/FS 2000, commonly abbreviated as Black Point FS 1003/FS 2000, stylized in all-lowercase in its logo) is a first-generation PC-50x home video game console released in 1982 by Süddeutsche Elektro-Hausgeräte GmbH & Co. KG (SHG) only in Germany for 168 Deutsche Mark (DM). The console has been manufactured by Radofin (Hong Kong).

The system comes with two detachable game controllers with one analog joystick and one fire button each. On the console, there are 10 buttons to select the games which came on cartridges. There is also a difficulty switch, an on/off switch and a start button on the housing of the console. There are two models of the console: The FS-1003 and the FS-2000. Both models have the name SHG Black Point.

It is the successor of the SHG Black Point Multicolor FS 1001, released in 1977, and SHG Black Point 10 Tele Sports FS 1002.

== Technical specifications ==
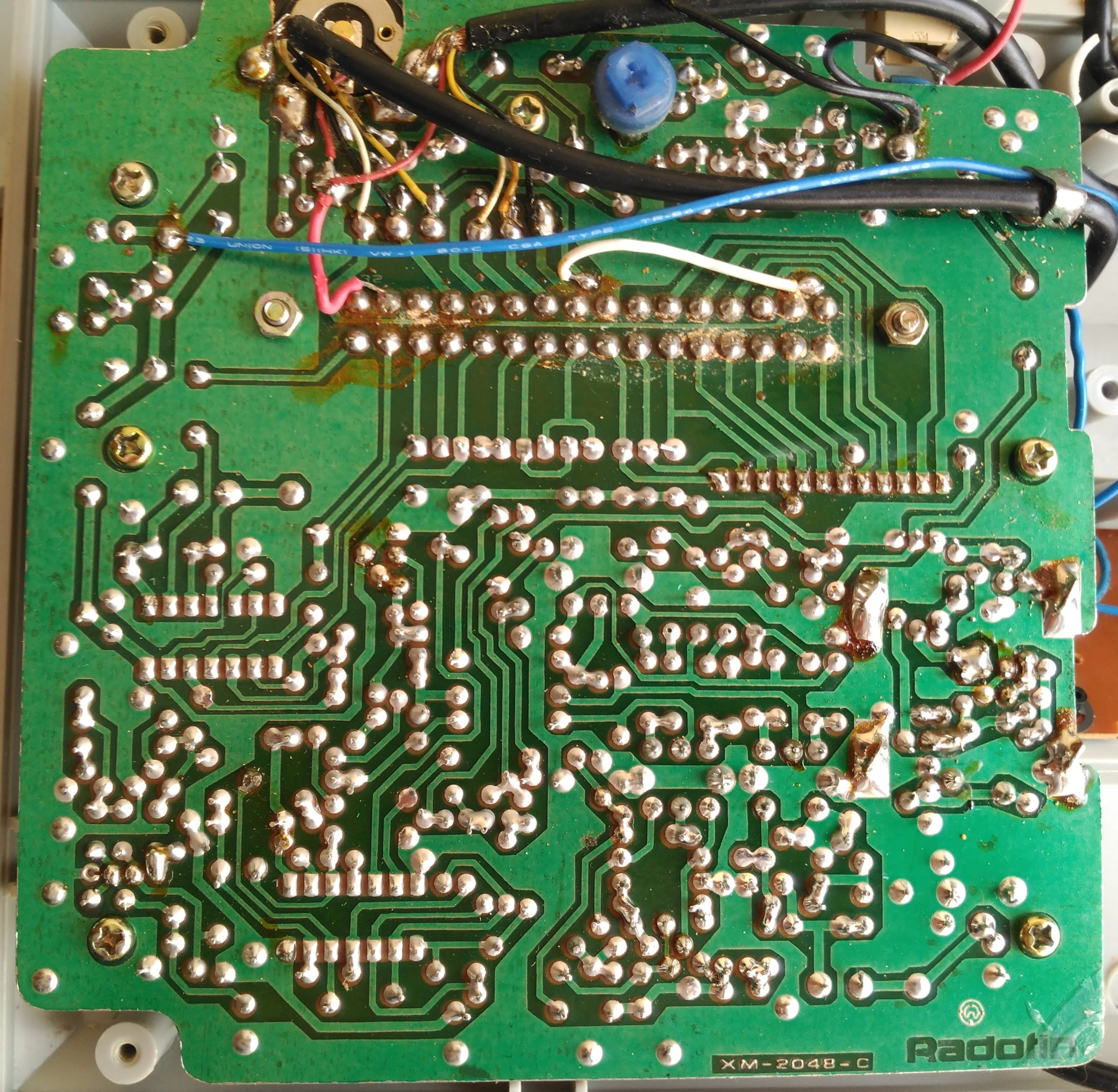
The FS 2000 PCB that shows the Radofin manufacturer

- Input devices: Two detachable analog game controllers and buttons on the console
- CPU: N/A
- RAM: N/A
- Power supply: 15 V, 120 mA (FS-1003)/9-11 V, 90 mA or 6 x 1.5 V batteries (FS-2000)
- Colors? Yes.
- Sound? Yes.

== Games ==
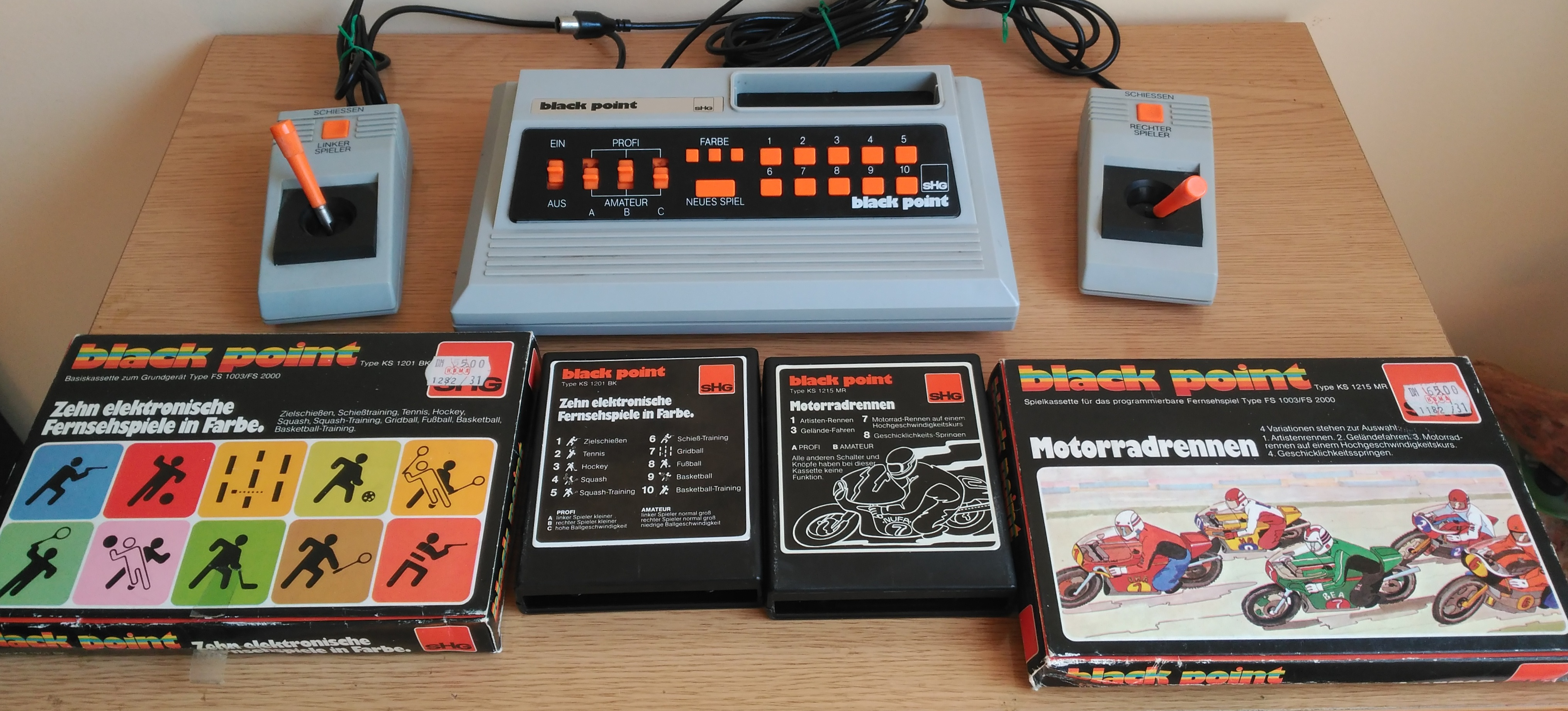
Black Point type FS 2000 with controllers and games

There are 7 or 8 games officially known to be released for the system which came on cartridges. Like the Palladium Tele-Cassetten Game and many other consoles, the SHG Black Point uses PC-50x cartridges. The games were sold for around 50 to 80 DM. (About 50 to 75 € in 2020.) The console itself did not contain a CPU or any RAM/ROM, but the cartridges contain one of the first generation console AY-3-8xxx chip. A cartridge with 10 different variations of Pong was included in the scope of delivery.

=== List of known cartridges ===
- FS 1201 Zehn elektronische Fernsehspiele in Farbe (Ten Color Electronic TV Games)
- FS 1202 Grand Prix
- FS 1203 Motorradrennen (Motorcycle Race)
- Seekrieg (Naval War)
- FS 1205 Panzerschlacht (Tank Battle)
- KS 1207 1000-Treffer-Spiel (1000 Hit Game)
- Schützenspiel (Shooter Game)
