= Palladium Tele-Cassetten Game =

Home video game console

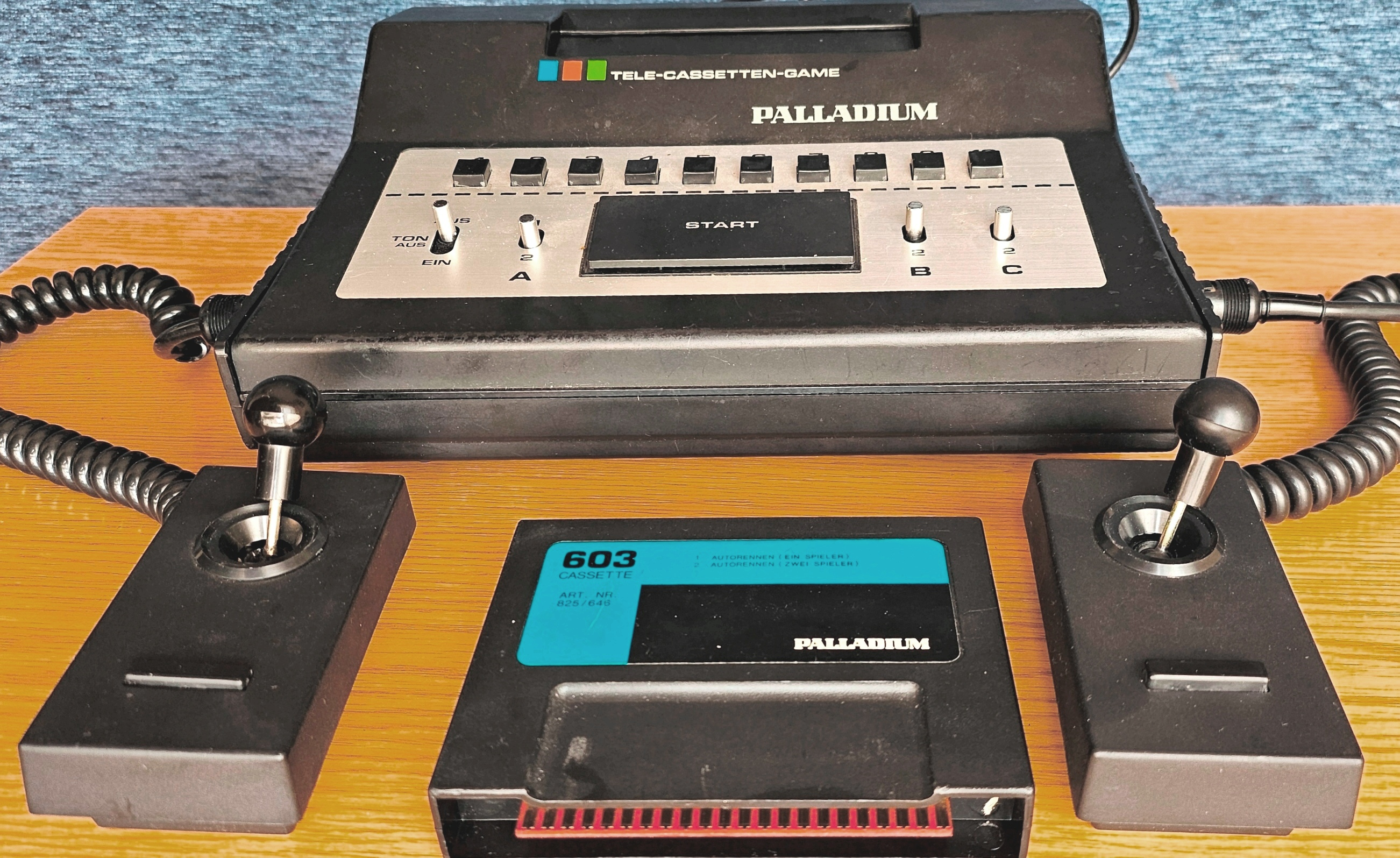
- A Palladium Tele-Cassetten Game with both of its controllers and a cartridge
- Developer: Palladium
- Manufacturer: Palladium
- Type: PC-50x home video game console
- Generation: First generation
- Released: Germany: 1978; 46 years ago
- Graphics: Colored
- Sound: Played via internal speaker
- Power: Power adaptor: 9V DC, 500 mA; Batteries: 6 x C/UM-2
- Predecessor: Several
- Successor: Palladium Video Computer Game

The Palladium Tele-Cassetten Game is a PC-50x home video game console which was released by Neckermann's technology and multimedia home brand Palladium in 1978 only in Germany. The console, like all the PC-50x consoles, is a first-generation console, even though it is sometimes considered a console of the second or third generation.

The console has many predecessors, but the exact predecessor console is difficult to find out since the exact release dates of these consoles are unknown or at least unclear.

In 1982, its successor, the Palladium Video Computer Game, was released.. The Video Computer Game was a clone of Emerson's Arcadia 2001. It was also part of the "Palladium Family" of Arcadia 2001 clones, which 4: Palladium itself, PolyBrain Video Computer Game, HGS Electronic Mr. Altus and Trakton Computer Video Game are compatible with each other. The Palladium Family consoles were mostly German, but Trakton was released in Australia.

== Overview ==
The Palladium Tele-Cassetten Game is powered with either a power adaptor with 9V DC and 500 mA or 6 C/UM-2 batteries and features difficulty settings, auto/manual serve options as well as a reset button. The system is contained in a black housing on which ten game selection switches (German Spielwahlschalter) can be found with which it is possible to choose between up to 10 different game modes depending on the game. There are also three buttons on the housing to change game options. There are two PC-50x different versions of the console known to exist: the 825/530 and 825/581. The controllers of the 825/581 model have fire buttons in contrast to those of the 825/530 model. Two controllers as well as four games (Kassette 603 (Autorennen, "Auto Race"), Kassette 606 (Tele-Bowling), Kassette 610 (10 Ballspiele, "10 Ball Games"), and Kassette 765 (Motoradrennen, "Motorcycle Race")) were in the scope of delivery of the 825/530 model. Also, the cases are slightly different between these two models.

The Palladium Tele-Cassetten Game can output color, and the sound is played through an internal speaker built in the console itself.

It is one of the very few consoles licensed by General Instrument and was licensed and marketed under various names by various companies, including the MBO-Teleball-Cassetten-Game by MBO Schmidt & Niederleitner GmbH & Co. KG (1977), Optim 600 by Optim (1978) and the TVG-3000 by Hanimex (1978). The first system's original console seems to be the MBO-Teleball-Cassetten-Game, manufactured in West Germany by MBO Schmidt & Niederleitner and released in the late 1970s.

=== Predecessors ===
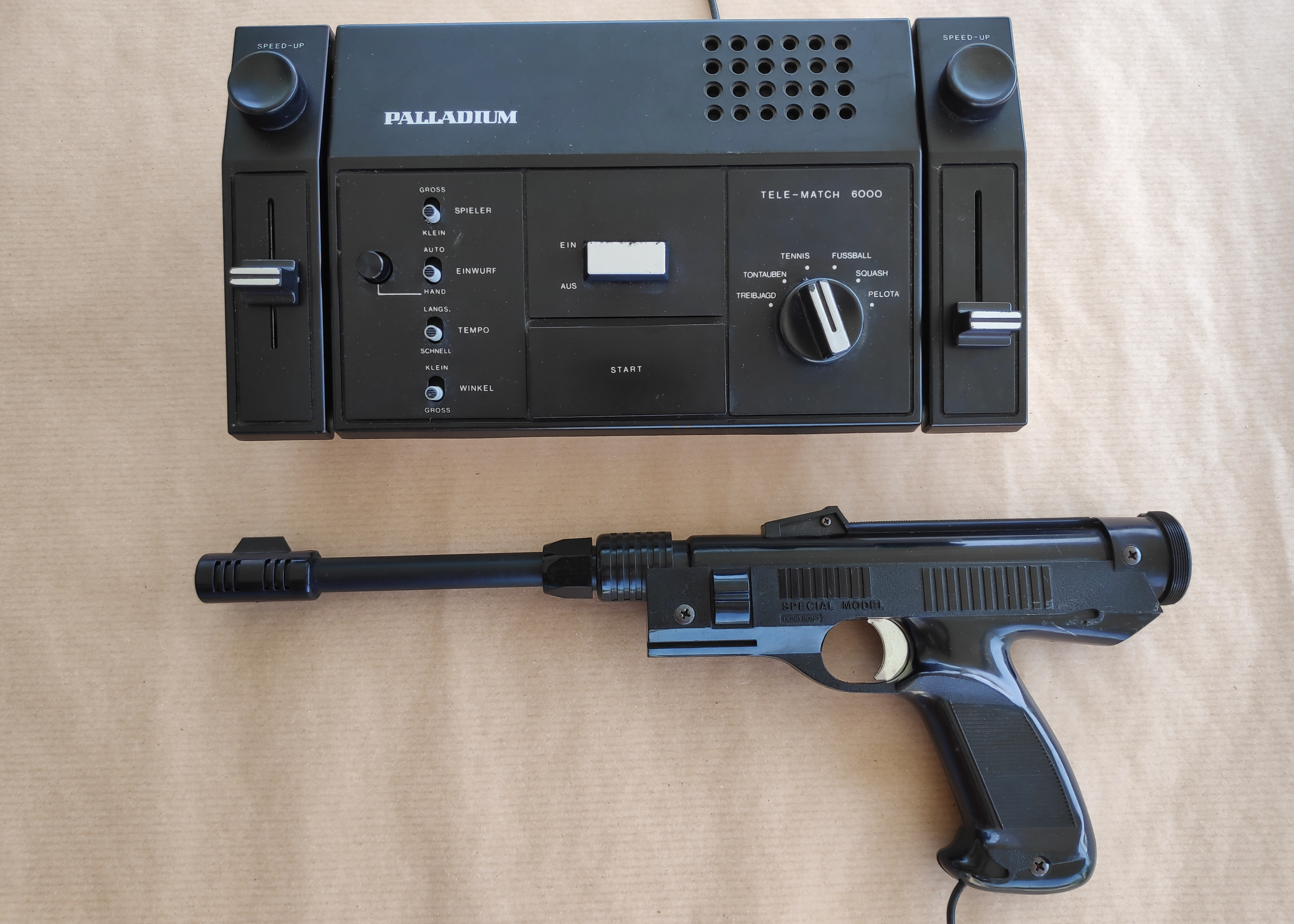
Tele-Match 6000

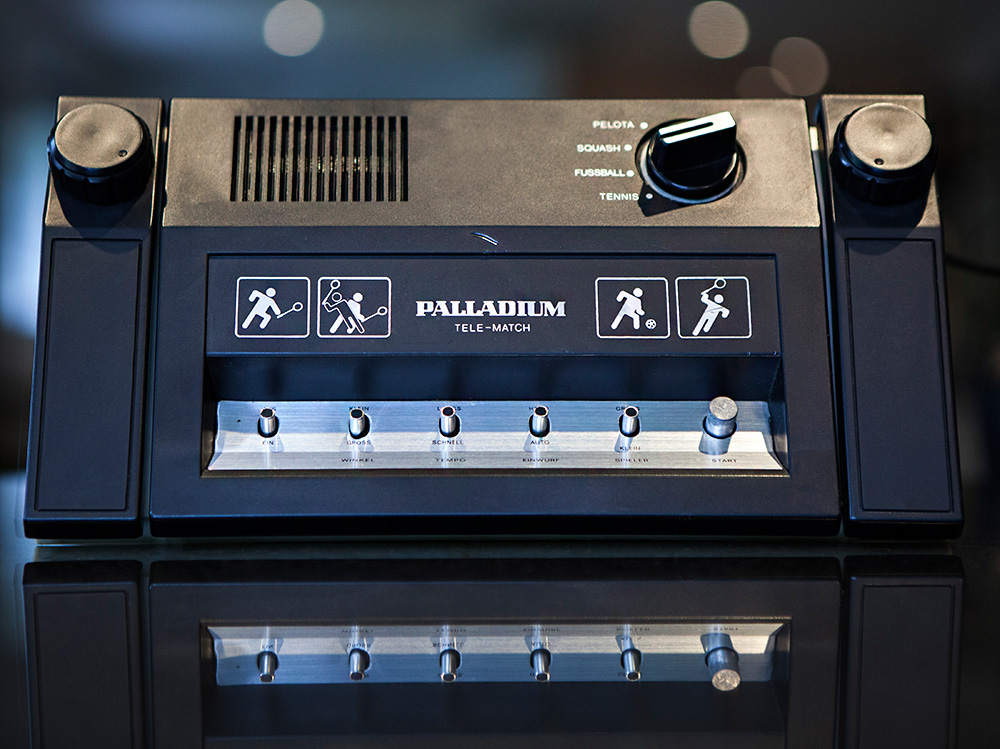
Tele-Match (825-468)

There are many predecessors of the Palladium Tele-Cassetten Game known to exist:

- Palladium Tele-Match 4000 (825-131) (1977)
- Palladium Tele-Match 6000 (825-166) (1977)
- Palladium Tele-Match 825-182 (1977)
- Palladium Tele-Match 825-425 (1977)
- Palladium Tele-Match 825-468 (1977)
- Palladium Tele-Match 825-344 (1977)
- Palladium Tele-Match Color 825-452 (1977)
- Palladium Tele-Match Color 825-484 (1977)
- Palladium Tele-Match Color R 825-352 (1977)
- Palladium Tele-Match Color R 825-387 (1977)
- Palladium Tele-Match Color R or SR 825-417 (1977)
- Palladium Tele-Match Color R 825-530 (1977)
- Palladium Tele-Multiplay S 825-395 (1977)
- Polygame Tele-Match (1977)
- Palladium Tele-Cassetten Game Color (1978) (Since this system was released in the same year as the Palladium Tele-Cassetten Game and has the word "Color" in its name, this may also be a revision or even a successor.)

== Games ==
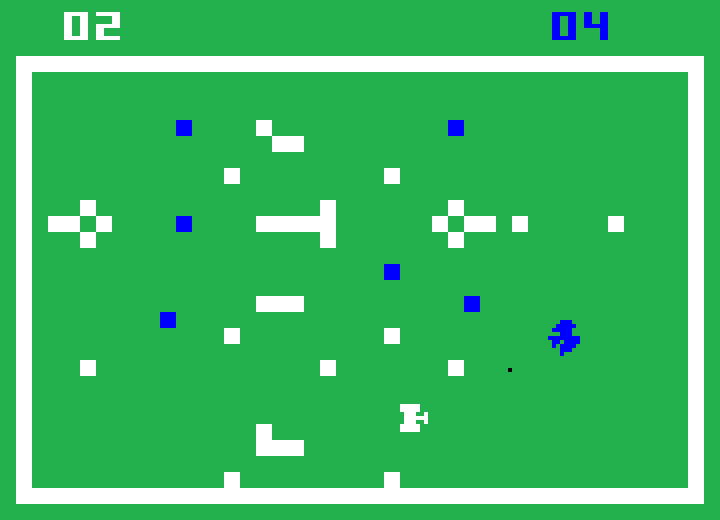
Screenshot of Tank battle

The games for the console came on cartridges. The system itself did not contain a CPU, but the cartridges contain one of the first-generation console AY-3-8xxx chip. Like the also German SHG Black Point and many other European consoles from the late 1970s and early 1980s, the Palladium Tele-Cassetten Game uses PC-50x cartridges. There are 7 cartridges known to have been released for the 825/581:

- Ball & paddlegaming
- Submarine
- Cycling
- Car race
- Shooting gallery
- Wipeout
- Tank battle
