= Bicone =

3D shape obtained by revolving a rhombus about one of its axes of symmetry

In geometry, a bicone or dicone (from Latin: bi-, and Greek: di-, both meaning "two") is the three-dimensional surface of revolution of a rhombus around one of its axes of symmetry. Equivalently, a bicone is the surface created by joining two congruent right circular cones at their bases. A bicone has circular symmetry and orthogonal bilateral symmetry.

== Geometry ==
For a bicone with radius $r$ and half-height $h$, the volume is

$$V = \frac{2}{3} \pi r^2 h$$

and the surface area is

$$A =2\pi r \ell\,$$

where

$$\ell = \sqrt{r^2 + h^2}$$

is the slant height.

Regular right symmetric n-gonal bipyramids:
| Bipyramid name | Digonal bipyramid | Triangular bipyramid | Square bipyramid | Pentagonal bipyramid | Hexagonal bipyramid | ... | Apeirogonal bipyramid |
|---|---|---|---|---|---|---|---|
| Polyhedron image | | | | | | ... | |
| Spherical tiling image | | | | | | Plane tiling image | |
| Face config. | V2.4.4 | V3.4.4 | V4.4.4 | V5.4.4 | V6.4.4 | ... | V∞.4.4 |
| Coxeter diagram | | | | | | ... | |

== See also ==
- Sphericon
- Biconical antenna
