= Developable surface =

Surface able to be flattened without distortion

The cylinder can be unrolled ("developed") to a plane, so it is a developable surface.

In mathematics, a developable surface (historically called a torse) is a smooth surface with zero Gaussian curvature. That is, it is a surface that can be flattened onto a plane without distortion (i.e. it can be bent without stretching or compression). Conversely, it is a surface which can be made by transforming a plane (i.e. "folding", "bending", "rolling", "cutting" and/or "gluing"). Because of these properties, developable surfaces are widely used in the design and fabrication of items to be made from sheet materials, ranging from textiles to sheet metal such as ductwork to shipbuilding.

Relatedly, in classical differential geometry, a development is the rolling of one smooth surface over another in Euclidean space. A surface is developable if it has a development.

All developable surfaces embedded in 3D-space are ruled surfaces (though hyperboloids are examples of ruled surfaces which are not developable). Because of this, many developable surfaces can be visualised as the surface formed by moving a straight line in space. For example, a cone is formed by keeping one end-point of a line fixed whilst moving the other end-point in a circle. However, there are developable surfaces in four-dimensional space $\mathbb{R}^4$ which are not ruled.

== Properties ==
=== Basic examples ===
The developable surfaces which can be realized in three-dimensional space include:

- Cylinders and, more generally, the "generalized" cylinder; its cross-section may be any smooth curve
- Cones and, more generally, conical surfaces; away from the apex
- The oloid and the sphericon are members of a special family of solids that develop their entire surface when rolling down a flat plane.
- Planes (trivially); which may be viewed as a cylinder whose cross-section is a line.

=== Other properties ===
A surface defined by $F(x, y, z) = 0$ is developable if
$$\left|\begin{array}{llll}
F_{x x} & F_{x y} & F_{x z} & F_x \\
F_{y x} & F_{y y} & F_{y z} & F_y \\
F_{z x} & F_{z y} & F_{z z} & F_z \\
F_x & F_y & F_z & 0
\end{array}\right|=0, \quad F_x=\partial F / \partial x, \text { etc }$$

=== Relation to ruled surfaces ===
Consider a ruled surface
$$F(s, v)=c(s)+v d(s), \quad|d(s)|=1$$
with $s$ the ruling parameter and $v$ the coordinate along each ruling. It is developable iff the tangent plane does not twist as you move along a ruling, i.e. the tangent plane at $F(s, v)$ is the same for all $v$ with that fixed $s$. In formulas, it says
$$\operatorname{det}\left(c^{\prime}(s), d(s), d^{\prime}(s)\right)=0, \quad \forall s$$
When that holds, infinitesimally close rulings intersect, and they produce a space curve as their envelope curve. The curve is traced out by $c(s)+v_0(s) d(s)$, where
$$v_0(s)=-\frac{\left\langle c^{\prime}(s), d^{\prime}(s)\right\rangle}{\left\langle d^{\prime}(s), d^{\prime}(s)\right\rangle}$$
This curve is the edge of regression of the original surface, and the original surface is the tangent developable of the curve. tangent line to $r$.

Generically, each developable surface has only one edge of regression. In this way, the theory of generic developable surfaces is the same as the theory of generic tangent developables.

Special developable surfaces have "degenerate" edges of regression, including a plane, a cylinder, a cone.

=== Tangent ===
Developable surfaces can be generated in infinite varieties with some general theorems.

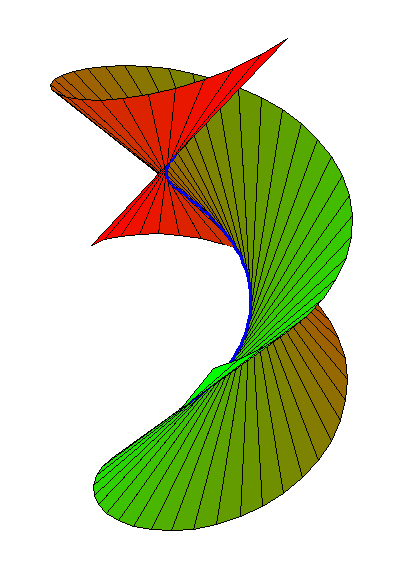
The tangent developable of a helix

As previously stated, the tangent developable surfaces are constructed by extending the tangent lines of a spatial curve. This is the envelope surface of the osculating planes of the curve. The curve itself is called the edge of regression of the developable surface.

The envelope surface of a differentiable 1-parameter family of planes is developable. In this way, any differentiable function of the type $\R \to \text{planes in }\R^3$ produces a developable surface.

=== Polar ===
Polar developables are constructed as follows: Given a smooth space curve $\gamma$, construct the osculating circles at each point, and then the line passing each center of the circle perpendicular to the circle's plane. These lines are the polar lines. Equivalently, construct the normal plane at every point. The normal planes of two infinitesimally close points intersect at a line. These lines are the polar lines. The polar lines sweep out a developable surface, since it is the envelope surface of the normal planes of the curve.

For example, the polar developable of a helix is obtained by screwing a plane along an axis that is not within the plane.

For a generic space curve, the edge of regression of its polar developable is the curve of centers of osculating spheres of the curve. In many texts this is also called the focal curve or spherical evolute of the curve.

Given a space curve $\gamma$, and another space curve $\mu$, we say that $\mu$ is an evolute curve of $\gamma$ iff each tangent of $\mu$ intersects $\gamma$ at a right angle. This is analogous to the concept of the evolute in plane curves, although note that in the plane, there is only one evolute per curve, but in space there in general exists a whole 1-parameter family of evolutes per curve. All evolute curves of $\gamma$ are geodesics of the polar developable of $\gamma$.

Let $\mu$ be an evolute of $\gamma$, then $\gamma$ is in the tangent developable of $\mu$, and $\gamma$ is orthogonal to its ruling.

The polar developable is a cylinder iff the original curve $\gamma$ is a curve in a plane $P$ orthogonal to the cylinder's direction. In this case, it is obtained by translating the evolute curve along the perpendicular direction of $P$.

Involutes of a circle

For example, let $\gamma$ be the involute of a circle. Regarded as a space curve, $\gamma$'s polar developable is the cylinder generating by moving the circle along its perpendicular direction. The evolutes of $\gamma$ are the helices on the cylinder, all passing the same cuspidal point where $\gamma$ touches the cylinder.

The polar developable is a cone iff the original curve is a curve on a sphere centered at the apex of the cone.

=== Normal ===
Focal surfaces (blue, pink) of a hyperbolic paraboloid(white) $z=x^2-y^2,\; 0\le x,y\le 0.5$

Given a curved surface, the normal lines along any line of curvature of the surface sweeps out a developable surface. In this way, a generic curved surface produces two 1-parameter families of developable surfaces, intersecting at right angles. These are the normal developables of the surface.

Take one of these two 1-parameter families. Each developable surface in the family has an edge of regression. These produce a whole 1-parameter family of edges of regression, and they sweep out a space surface. The other family sweeps out another space surface. These are the two focal surfaces of the original surface.

=== Geodesics ===
The geodesics of a plane are straight lines, so the geodesics of a developable surface can be obtained by first rolling it flat on the plane, drawing a straight line, then unrolling it back. This produces the 2-parameter family of all geodesics.

== Non-developable surface ==
Most smooth surfaces (and most surfaces in general) are not developable surfaces. Non-developable surfaces are variously referred to as having "double curvature", "doubly curved", "compound curvature", "non-zero Gaussian curvature", etc.

=== Examples ===
Spheres are not developable surfaces under any metric as they cannot be unrolled onto a plane.

The helicoid is a ruled surface – but unlike the ruled surfaces mentioned above, it is not a developable surface.

The hyperbolic paraboloid and the hyperboloid are slightly different doubly ruled surfaces – but unlike the ruled surfaces mentioned above, neither one is a developable surface.

== Applications ==
Comparison of tangent and secant cylindrical, conic and azimuthal map projections with standard parallels shown in red

Developable surfaces have several practical applications.

Many cartographic projections involve projecting the Earth to a developable surface and then "unrolling" the surface into a region on the plane.

Since developable surfaces may be constructed by bending a flat sheet, they are also important in manufacturing objects from sheet metal, cardboard, and plywood. An industry which uses developed surfaces extensively is shipbuilding.

Any surface producible from origami without tearing is a developable surface. These are used especially in curved origami.

Developable mechanisms are mechanisms that conform to a developable surface and can exhibit motion (deploy) off the surface.

=== Of non-developable surfaces ===
Many gridshells and tensile structures and similar constructions gain strength by using (any) doubly curved form.

== See also ==
- Development (differential geometry)
- Developable roller
