= Neckermann (company) =

Former German mail order company

Neckermann Versand AG

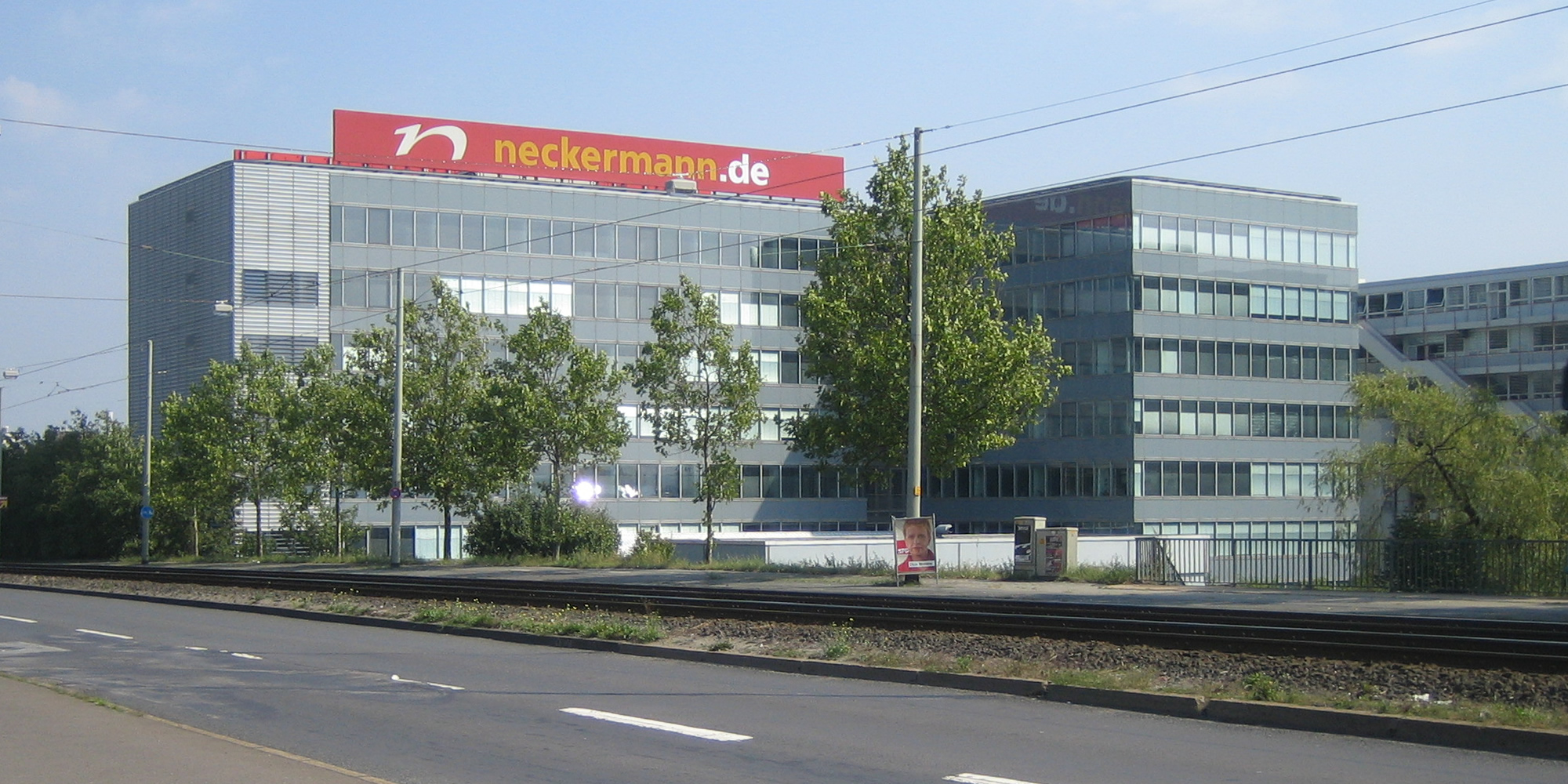
- Headquarters in Frankfurt am Main
- Genre: Mail order
- Founded: 1 April 1950
- Founder: Josef Neckermann
- Headquarters: Frankfurt am Main, Germany
- Owner: Otto Group
- Website: www.neckermann.de

Neckermann Versand AG is a former German mail order company founded by Josef Neckermann on 1 April 1950. It was one of the leading mail order companies in Europe.

On November 28, 2019, it was announced that Neckermann Belgium Travel had entered into an agreement with the online tour operator Sunweb.

On June 7, 2021, Neckermann was acquired by the Belgian investment company CIM Capital.

== History ==
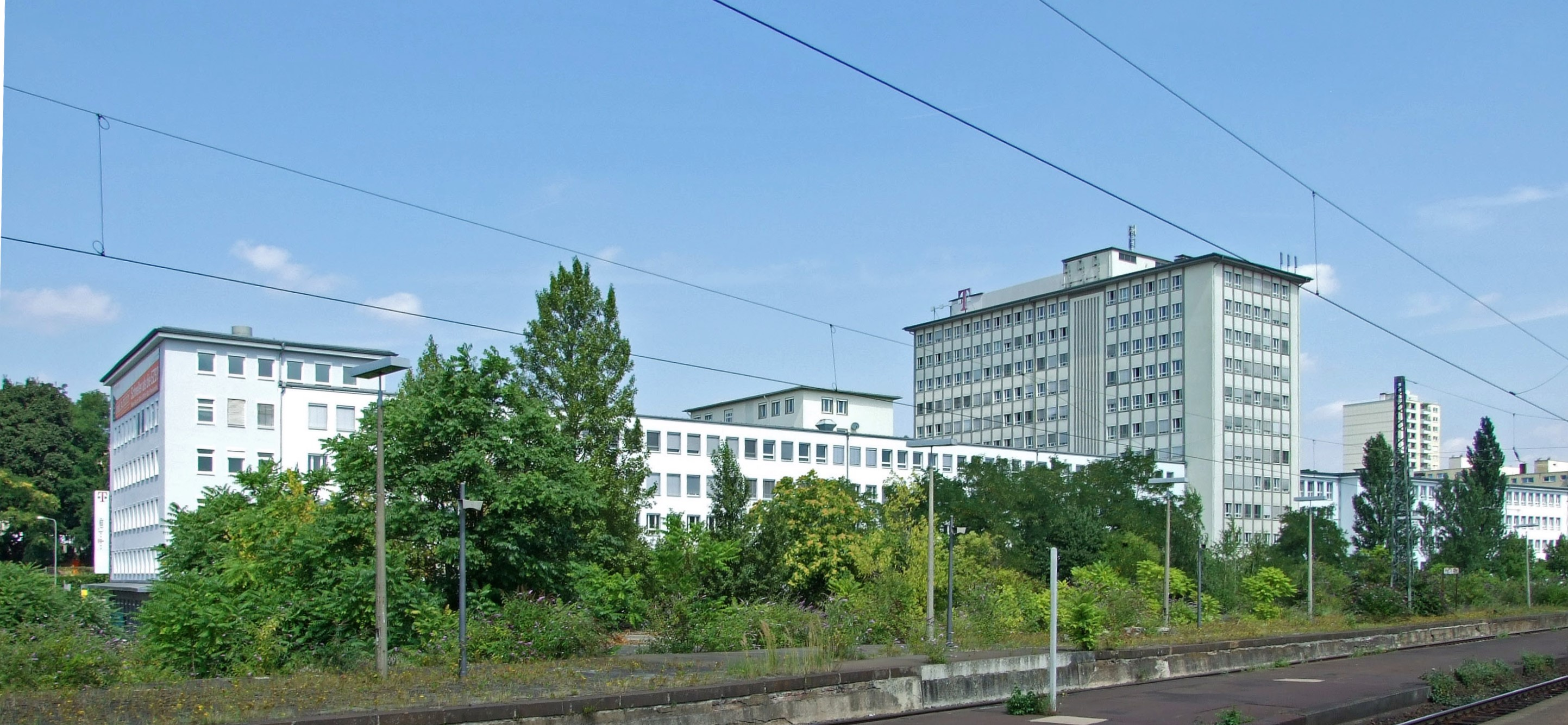
Former headquarters of Neckermann Versand AG from 1953 to 1960 in Danziger Platz

Neckermann Versand AG was founded on April 1, 1950 by Josef Neckermann.

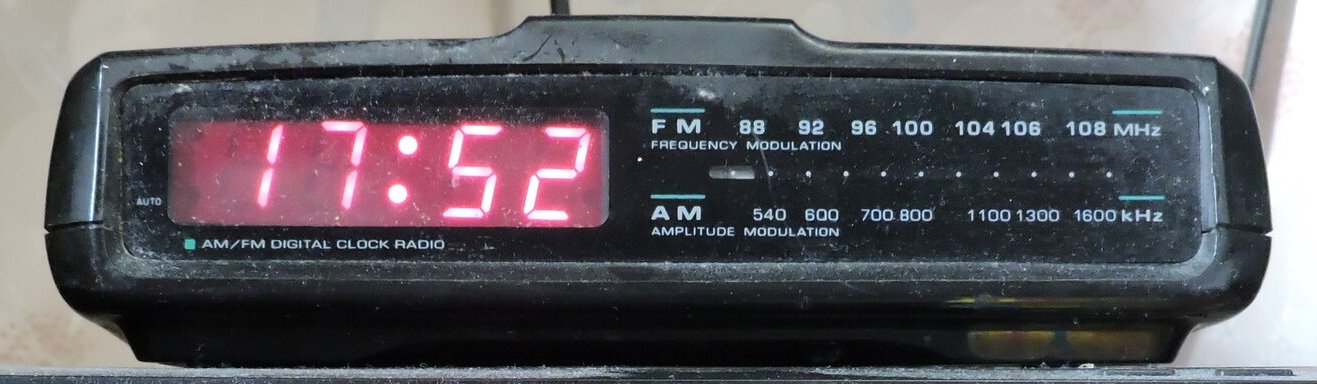
Radio clock home brand Palladium, model 944/890

In 1978, Neckermann tried to gain a foothold in the gaming industry by releasing the Tele-Cassetten Game under their technology and multimedia home brand Palladium. From 1995, the company operated its own online shop at neckermann.de, through which almost 80 percent of sales were processed. The range consisted of over 700,000 articles from fashion, household, toy and technology segments. Since October 8, 2010, Neckermann is 100 percent owned by Sun Capital Partners.

On July 18, 2012, Neckermann.de GmbH and its subsidiary Neckermann Logistik GmbH filed for bankruptcy proceedings at the Amtsgericht Frankfurt am Main. The bankruptcy proceedings were officially opened on October 1, 2012. Since February 4, 2013, Otto Group maintains an online mail order company at neckermann.de.

On November 28, 2019, it was announced that Neckermann Belgium Travel had entered into an agreement with the online tour operator Sunweb. As a result, Sunweb holidays were to be sold exclusively through Neckermann’s travel agencies. This partnership enabled Neckermann to restore around 90 percent of its former portfolio.

On June 7, 2021, Neckermann was acquired by the Belgian investment company CIM Capital.
