= Rolling cone motion =

Special motion in physics

Rolling cone motion is the rolling motion generated by a cone rolling over another cone. In rolling cone motion, at least one of the cones is convex, while the other cone may be either convex, or concave, or a flat surface (a flat surface can be regarded as a special case of a cone whose apex angle equals $\pi$). The distinguishing characteristic of a rolling cone, in relation to other axially symmetrical rollers (cylinder, sphere, round disk), is that while rolling on a flat surface, the cone's center of gravity performs a circular motion rather than a linear one. Another unique characteristic is that one of its points (its apex) is at rest throughout the entire motion.

== Kinematics ==
An illustration of a cone rolling over another cone

The motion of a rolling cone can be described as a superposition of a rotational motion of the cone around its axis of symmetry, and a rotary motion of its axis around the axis of symmetry of the stationary cone. The ratio between the angular velocities of these two motions is given by:

$$\frac{\omega_2}{\omega_1} ={\sin\alpha\over\sin\beta}$$

where $\alpha$ and $\beta$ are the half apex angles of the stationary cone and the rolling cone, respectively, $\omega_1$ is the angular velocity of the rolling cone's axis of symmetry around the axis of symmetry of the stationary cone, and $\omega_2$ is the angular velocity of the rolling cone around its own axis of symmetry. In the special case of a cone rolling on a flat surface (i.e. $\alpha=\frac{\pi}{2}$), this ratio becomes $\frac{1}{\sin\beta}$. For example, a cone having an apex angle of 60 degrees, while being rolled on a flat surface, will perform exactly two full rotations around its axis of symmetry before returning to its original position.

== Use ==
One of the most practical applications of rolling cones is the use of tapered roller bearings in rotating devices. Tapered bearings can bear higher loads than ball bearings in both radial and axial directions, and therefore are more frequently used as wheel bearings in most wheeled land vehicles.

In Conveyor systems, conical rollers are sometimes used when there's a need to create a curved path. A common example is belt conveyors in airport terminals where there's a need to move the luggage in loops.

In the 18th and 19th century rolling cone motion was used in the process of olive oil extraction. The olives were put in a large circular basin and heavy metal cones were rolled upon them. The fact that a cone can roll in circles without sliding made it more efficient to use conical roller millstones.
