= Two roll rubber mill =

Machine for processing natural rubber

The two roll rubber mill is a machine used to process natural rubber into various compounds. Two horizontally opposed stainless steel rolls rotate in opposite directions towards each other at different speeds to mix the rubber and ingredients used to create the rubber compounds.

== History ==
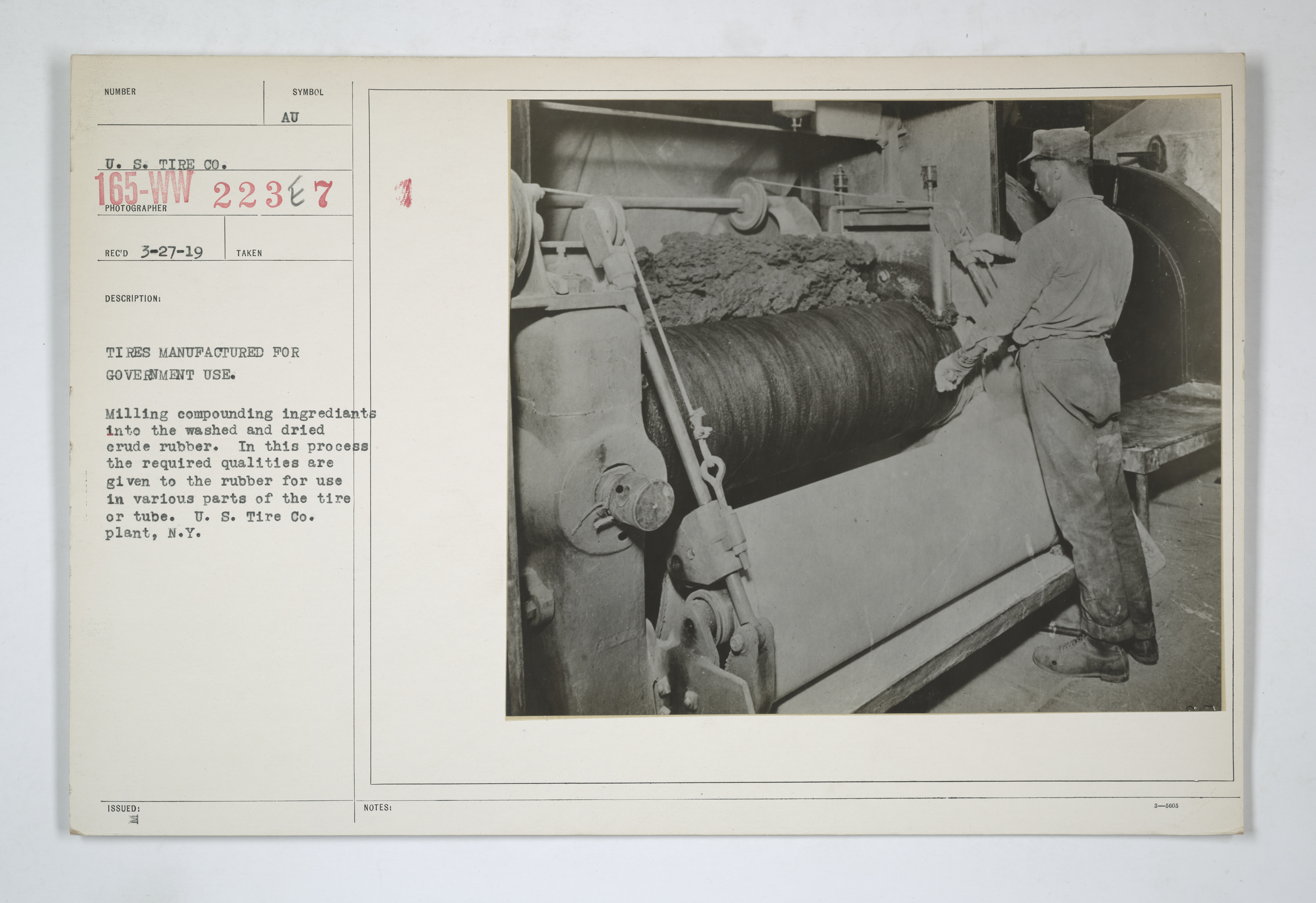
Rubber being produced using a two roll rubber mill

Natural rubber, which is harvested from a rubber tree, hevea brasiliensis is the base for many rubber compounds made using a two roll rubber mill. Rubber trees are tapped to remove the latex that is stored in their trunks. This material can then be mixed with additional ingredients to create rubber. Other natural sources of rubber are obtained from the Sapotaceae and Palaquium trees native to the Malay peninsula, as well as the Mimusops globoosa tree native to Panama. Synthetic rubbers have also been created and are also used to create rubber compounds.

In the 1830s, Edwin Chaffee developed a technology similar to the two roll rubber mills that are used in rubber production. His machine included multiple rollers that were used to flatten rubber into thin sheets. Chaffee then created the two roll rubber mill which shears and mixes the rubber by having two rolls rotate in opposite directions, at different speeds. The two roll rubber mill is used in almost every rubber production facility today. Many other inventors created rubber mills with varying degrees of similarity to Chaffee's initial designs. George Watkinson patented a three roll design in 1894 while Harold Denmire patented a four roll design in 1932.

== Operation ==
To produce the rubber used in tires, hoses, shoes and many other applications, the rubber first has to be created using a two roll rubber mill. A rubber mill consists of two horizontally opposed stainless steel rolls that rotate in opposite directions, at different speeds. The rolls rotate towards each other, one faster than the other. The distance between the two rolls can also be adjusted by the operator. The opposing rotation directions and different speeds produces a combined shear and compression force on the material being mixed on the mill. With open roll rubber mills, the operator may also be in charge of adding ingredients to the rubber while it is being mixed on the mill. Because chemical reactions are occurring during the process of mixing a rubber compound, the compound often heats up. To help keep the rubber compound cool, often one of the rolls is hollow and can be hooked up to a cooling water line which then allows cool water to flow through the roll, cooling the metal roll and therefore the rubber.

While the process of operating a rubber mill sounds simple enough, it is very dangerous and many precautions are added to ensure the safety of the operator. Operators and safety personnel must go through extensive training in order to be certified to operate a rubber mill. Because the two rolls of the mill are rolling inwards, it is easy for an individual's hand to get sucked into the mill. This not only crushes the hand, but if the individual quickly removes their hand, it can result in degloving. Safety features include emergency stop bars located 40” vertically above the rolls, which can be pulled at any time to stop the rolling of the mill. Pressure sensitive body bars are also located at knee height so that the machine can be stopped by the operator tapping the bar with their knee. Protective equipment such as safety glasses are also worn. There is also normally a safety operator, in addition to the main operator that is also trained to use the rubber mill and is trained on what to do in the case of an emergency situation.

== Rubber compounding ==
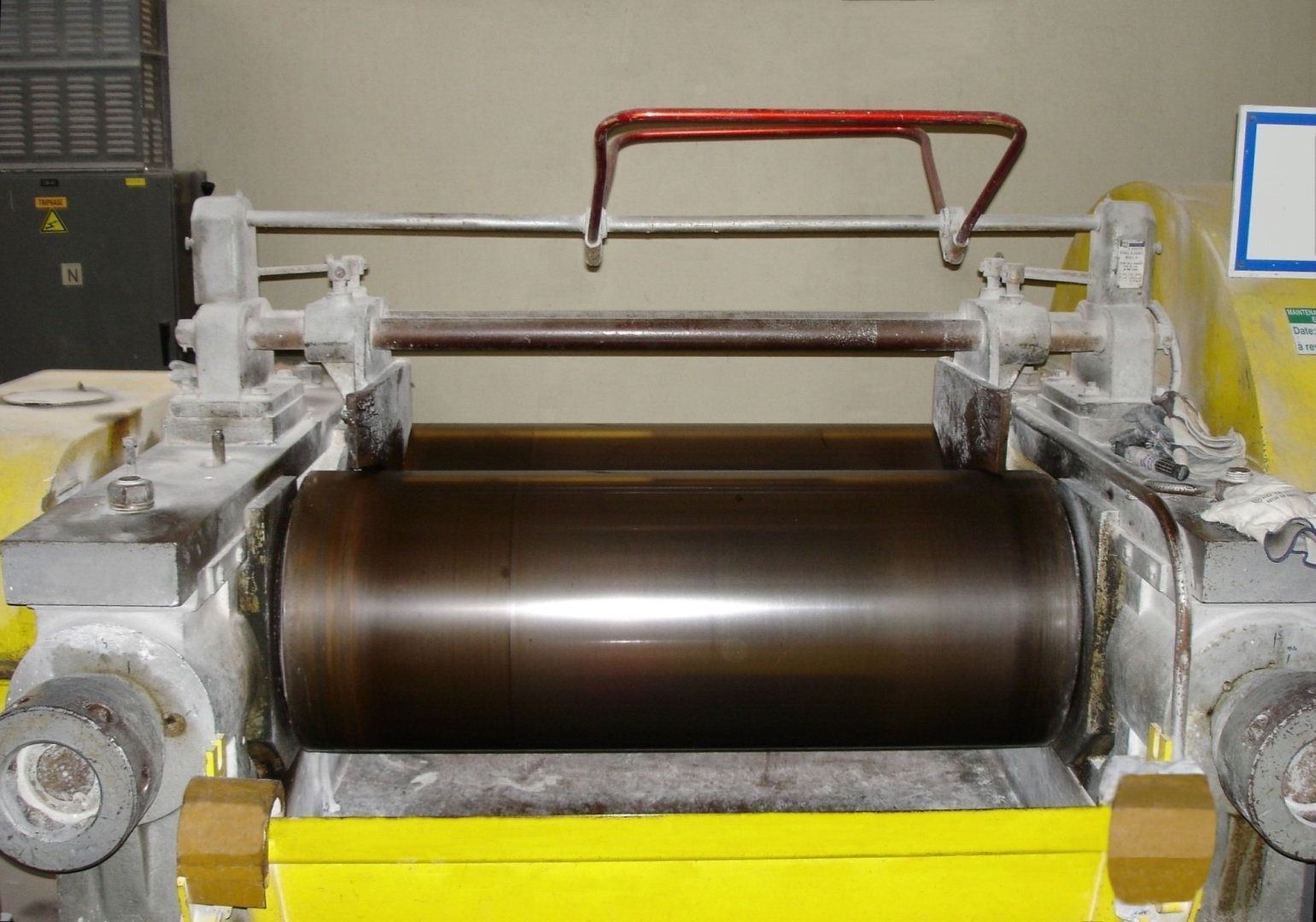
Image of two roll rubber mill, including safety features

Rubber compounding means incorporating rubber ingredients into a rubber mixture so it is evenly dispersed, then the rubber mixture is called a rubber compound. The mill aids in two main steps of rubber processing - mastication and mixing. Mastication is when the raw polymer is sheared and the broken down to create an easier flow. This allows for better incorporation of materials, which leads to the mixing component, when the other materials for a compound are added.

To create a rubber compound on a mill, first a raw polymer, or base polymer, is needed. The polymer can be a number of things, including natural rubber, such as of SMR CV, SMR 20, SMR L or a variety of synthetic rubbers such as nitrile (NBR), ethylene propylene diene monomer (EPDM), butyl, polycholorprene (CR), Polyisoprene (IR) and others.

The raw rubber after being masticated, in which normally for natural rubber, other ingredients needed to be compounded into the raw polymer either on a mixing Banbury Kneader or other rubber mixing machine then pass to two roll mill for dispersion and sheeting out for rubber compound that is suitable for molding dimension. Rubbing compounding also can be mixed on two roll mill by sequentially adding the ingredient and fold, cut and roll the rubber to mix. This process create rubber that can be used to create products.

Ingredients added to make a rubber compound include oils, fillers and accelerator, which usually includes sulfur or peroxide, and may also include a metal oxide either as activator such as zinc oxide, in some cases as filler and also as activator. After mixing, a compound is removed from the mill in a large sheet, and then molded into its desired product.
