= Theorema Egregium =

Result of differential geometry proved by Gauss

A consequence of the Theorema Egregium is that the Earth cannot be displayed on a map without distortion.

The Mercator projection preserves angles but fails to preserve area, hence the massive distortion of Antarctica.

Cylindrical equal-area projections such as the Behrmann projection instead preserve area but not angles.

Each orange spot is a Tissot's indicatrix showing how identical infinitesimal circles are distorted at each point.

Gauss's Theorema Egregium (Latin for "remarkable theorem") is a major result of differential geometry, proved by Carl Friedrich Gauss in 1827, that concerns the curvature of surfaces. The theorem says that Gaussian curvature can be determined entirely by measuring angles, distances and their rates of change on a surface, without reference to the particular manner in which the surface is embedded in the ambient 3-dimensional Euclidean space. In other words, the Gaussian curvature of a surface does not change if one bends the surface without stretching it. Thus the Gaussian curvature is an intrinsic invariant of a surface.

Gauss presented the theorem in this manner (translated from Latin):

Thus the formula of the preceding article leads itself to the remarkable Theorem. If a curved surface is developed upon any other surface whatever, the measure of curvature in each point remains unchanged.

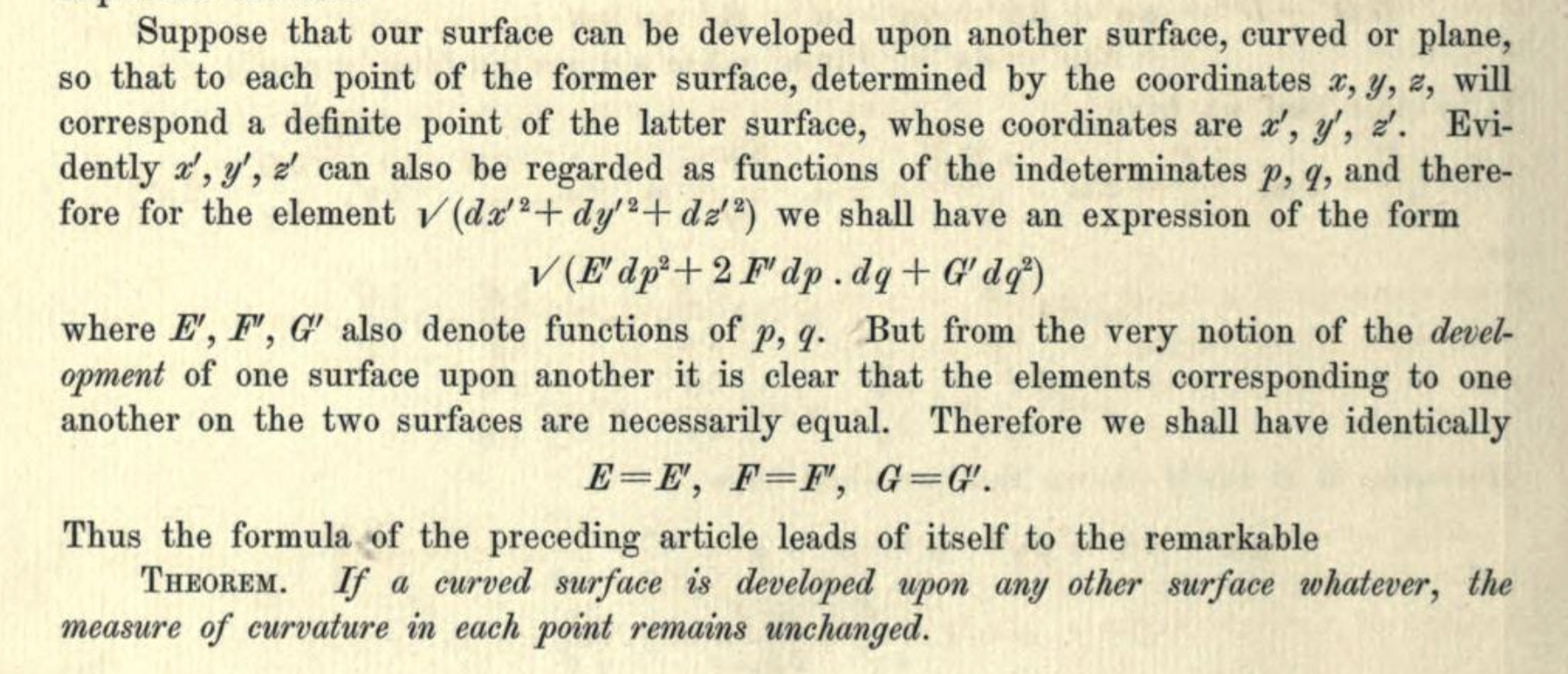
Gauss's original statement of the Theorema Egregium, translated from Latin into English.

The theorem is "remarkable" because the definition of Gaussian curvature makes ample reference to the specific way the surface is embedded in 3-dimensional space, and it is quite surprising that the result does not depend on its embedding.

In modern mathematical terminology, the theorem may be stated as follows:

The Gaussian curvature of a surface is invariant under local isometry.

== Elementary applications ==
Animation showing the deformation of a helicoid into a catenoid. The deformation is accomplished by bending without stretching. During the process, the Gaussian curvature of the surface at each point remains constant.

A sphere of radius R has constant Gaussian curvature which is equal to 1/R^{2}. At the same time, a plane has zero Gaussian curvature. As a corollary of Theorema Egregium, a piece of paper cannot be bent onto a sphere without crumpling. Conversely, the surface of a sphere cannot be unfolded onto a flat plane without distorting the distances. If one were to step on an empty egg shell, its edges have to split in expansion before being flattened. Mathematically, a sphere and a plane are not isometric, even locally. This fact is significant for cartography: it implies that no planar (flat) map of Earth can be perfect, even for a portion of the Earth's surface. Thus every cartographic projection necessarily distorts at least some distances.

The catenoid and the helicoid are two very different-looking surfaces. Nevertheless, each of them can be continuously bent into the other: they are locally isometric. It follows from Theorema Egregium that under this bending the Gaussian curvature at any two corresponding points of the catenoid and helicoid is always the same. Thus isometry is simply bending and twisting of a surface without internal crumpling or tearing, in other words without extra tension, compression, or shear.

An application of the theorem is seen when a flat object is somewhat folded or bent along a line, creating rigidity in the perpendicular direction. This is of practical use in construction, as well as in a common pizza-eating strategy: A flat slice of pizza can be seen as a surface with constant Gaussian curvature 0. Gently bending a slice must then roughly maintain this curvature (assuming the bend is roughly a local isometry). If one bends a slice horizontally along a radius, non-zero principal curvatures are created along the bend, dictating that the other principal curvature at these points must be zero. This creates rigidity in the direction perpendicular to the fold, an attribute desirable for eating pizza, as it holds its shape long enough to be consumed without a mess. This same principle is used for strengthening in corrugated materials, most familiarly with corrugated fiberboard and corrugated galvanised iron, and in some forms of potato chips as well.

== Sketch proof ==
Following Do Carmo we can express the second derivative of a parametrisation of a surface, in terms of the first fundamental form, second fundamental form and Christoffel symbols, then find equations linking the Christoffel symbols to the coefficients of the first fundamental form and their derivatives, showing that these are Christoffel symbols are invariant under isometries. Finally, an equation linking Gaussian curvature to Christoffel symbols shows that it is also invariant under isometries.

Let $S, \tilde{S}$ be regular surfaces, and let $\mathbf{r} = \mathbf{r}(u,v)$ be a parametrisation of a patch of the surface $S$, with unit normal $\mathbf{N}$. Denote the first derivatives of $\mathbf{r}$ with respect to $u$ and $v$ by $\mathbf{r}_u$ and $\mathbf{r}_v$ and the second derivatives by $\mathbf{r}_{uu}, \mathbf{r}_{uv}, \mathbf{r}_{vv}$. (As our surface is regular, $\mathbf{r}_{vu} = \mathbf{r}_{uv}$.)

Definition:

A diffeomorphism $\phi : S \to \tilde{S}$ is an isometry if for all $p\in S$ and all pairs $\mathbf{w}_1, \mathbf{w}_2 \in T_p(S)$ the tangent space to $S$ we have
$$\langle \mathbf{w}_1, \mathbf{w}_2 \rangle_p = \langle d\phi_p(\mathbf{w}_1), d\phi_p(\mathbf{w}_1) \rangle_{\phi(p)}.$$
In other words, the differential map between tangent spaces, $d\phi_p:T_p(S)\to T_{\phi(p)}(\tilde{S})$ preserves the inner product.

This definition of isometry applies to the whole surface, for the theorem we only need a weaker definition, defined for small neighbourhoods.

Definition:

A map $\phi : V \to \tilde{S}$ of a neighbourhood of $V$ of $p\in S$ is a local isometry if there a neighbourhood $\tilde{V}$ of $\phi(p)\in \tilde{S}$ such that $\phi:V\to\tilde{V}$ is an isometry.

If there exists local isometries for each $p\in S$ then $S$ and $\tilde{S}$ are said to be locally isometric.

An immediate consequence is if $\mathbf{x}(u,v)$ is a parametrisation of $V \subset S$ and $\phi \circ \mathbf{x}(u,v)$ is a parametrisation of $\tilde{V}\subset \tilde{S}$ then the coefficients of the first fundamental form for both surfaces agree:
$$\begin{align}
E &= \langle \mathbf{x}_u , \mathbf{x}_u \rangle &= \tilde{E} &= \langle d\phi_p(\mathbf{x}_u),d\phi_p(\mathbf{x}_u) \rangle \\
F &= \langle \mathbf{x}_u , \mathbf{x}_v \rangle &= \tilde{F} &= \langle d\phi_p(\mathbf{x}_u),d\phi_p(\mathbf{x}_v) \rangle \\
G &= \langle \mathbf{x}_v , \mathbf{x}_v \rangle &= \tilde{G} &= \langle d\phi_p(\mathbf{x}_v),d\phi_p(\mathbf{x}_v) \rangle \\
\end{align}$$
Furthermore, as $E - \tilde{E} = 0$ for all point $(u,v) \in \mathbf{x}^{-1}(V)$ in the parameter space the derivatives are equal $E_u - \tilde{E}_u = 0$, etc., as are all higher derivatives.

Now consider the second derivatives of a parametrisation $\mathbf{r} = \mathbf{r}(u,v)$, these can be expressed in terms of the basis $\mathbf{r}_u, \mathbf{r}_v, \mathbf{N}$ and Christoffel symbols $\Gamma_{ij}^k$,

$$\begin{align} \mathbf{r}_{uu} & = \Gamma_{11}^1 \mathbf{r}_u + \Gamma_{11}^2 \mathbf{r}_v + L \mathbf{N} \\ \mathbf{r}_{uv} & = \Gamma_{12}^1 \mathbf{r}_u + \Gamma_{12}^2 \mathbf{r}_v + M \mathbf{N} \\ \mathbf{r}_{vv} & = \Gamma_{22}^1 \mathbf{r}_u + \Gamma_{22}^2 \mathbf{r}_v + N \mathbf{N}. \\ \end{align}$$	1

Taking the dot product of each equation with $\mathbf{N}$ shows that the coefficients $L, M, N$ are the coefficients of the second fundamental form, $L = \mathrm{I\!I}(u,u), M = \mathrm{I\!I}(u,v), N = \mathrm{I\!I}(v,v)$.

Let $E, F, G$ be the coefficients of the first fundamental form $E = \mathrm{I}(u,u) = \mathbf{r}_u \cdot \mathbf{r}_u$, $F = \mathrm{I}(u,v) = \mathbf{r}_u \cdot \mathbf{r}_v$, $G = \mathrm{I}(v,v) = \mathbf{r}_v \cdot \mathbf{r}_v$. Their derivatives with respect to $u, v$ are
$$\begin{align}
E_u &= 2 \mathbf{r}_{uu} \cdot \mathbf{r}_u \\
E_v &= 2 \mathbf{r}_{uv} \cdot \mathbf{r}_u \\
F_u &= \mathbf{r}_{uu} \cdot \mathbf{r}_v + \mathbf{r}_{uv} \cdot \mathbf{r}_u  \\
F_v &= \mathbf{r}_{uv} \cdot \mathbf{r}_v + \mathbf{r}_{vv} \cdot \mathbf{r}_u \\
G_u &= 2 \mathbf{r}_{uv} \cdot \mathbf{r}_v \\
G_v &= 2 \mathbf{r}_{vv} \cdot \mathbf{r}_v.
\end{align}$$
Now take dot products of the second derivatives of the surface with $\mathbf{r}_u$ and $\mathbf{r}_v$ to obtain expressions for the Christoffel symbols.
$$\begin{align}
\mathbf{r}_{uu} \cdot \mathbf{r}_u &= \Gamma_{11}^1 E + \Gamma_{11}^2 F & = \tfrac12 E_u\\
\mathbf{r}_{uu} \cdot \mathbf{r}_v &= \Gamma_{11}^1 F + \Gamma_{11}^2 G & = F_u - \tfrac12 E_v\\
\mathbf{r}_{uv} \cdot \mathbf{r}_u &= \Gamma_{12}^1 E + \Gamma_{12}^2 F & = \tfrac12 E_v\\
\mathbf{r}_{uv} \cdot \mathbf{r}_v &= \Gamma_{12}^1 F + \Gamma_{12}^2 G & = \tfrac12 G_u \\
\mathbf{r}_{vv} \cdot \mathbf{r}_u &= \Gamma_{22}^1 E + \Gamma_{22}^2 F & = F_v - \tfrac12 G_u \\
\mathbf{r}_{vv} \cdot \mathbf{r}_v &= \Gamma_{22}^1 F + \Gamma_{22}^2 G & = \tfrac12 G_v\\
\end{align}$$
Each pair of equations can be written as a matrix, for the first two
$$\begin{pmatrix} E & F \\ F & G \end{pmatrix} \begin{pmatrix}\Gamma_{11}^1 \\ \Gamma_{11}^2\end{pmatrix}
= \begin{pmatrix} \tfrac12 E_u\\ F_u - \tfrac12 E_v\end{pmatrix}$$
and for non-singular surfaces the matrix is invertible with determinant $E G - F^2\ne 0$, showing the Christoffel symbols can be expressed in terms of the coefficient of first fundamental form and their derivatives. This is a key result showing all geometric concepts and properties expressed in terms of the Christoffel symmetries are invariant under local isometries. We now show the Gaussian curvature can be expressed in this way.

By the Weingarten equations the derivatives of the unit normal can be written as $\mathbf{N}_u = a_{11} \mathbf{r}_u + a_{21} \mathbf{r}_v, \mathbf{N}_v = a_{12} \mathbf{r}_u + a_{22} \mathbf{r}_v$ and equations for these coefficients can be expressed in terms of the coefficient of the first and second fundamental forms,
$$a_{11} = \frac{M F - L G}{E G - F^2},\quad
a_{12} = \frac{N F - M G}{E G - F^2},\quad
a_{21} = \frac{L F - M E}{E G - F^2},\quad
a_{22} = \frac{M F - N E}{E G - F^2},$$

The third derivatives of our parameterisation $\mathbf{r}_{uuv}$ can be expressed as either $(\mathbf{r}_{uu})_v$ or $(\mathbf{r}_{uv})_u$ differentiating the two equations for 1 and equating these gives
$$\begin{align}
& \Gamma_{11}^1 \mathbf{r}_{uv} + \Gamma_{11}^2 \mathbf{r}_{vv} + L \mathbf{N}_v
+(\Gamma_{11}^1)_v \mathbf{r}_u + (\Gamma_{11}^2)_v \mathbf{r}_v + L_v \mathbf{N} \\
& =
\Gamma_{12}^1 \mathbf{r}_{uu} + \Gamma_{12}^2 \mathbf{r}_{vu} + M \mathbf{N}_u+
(\Gamma_{12}^1)_u \mathbf{r}_u + (\Gamma_{12}^2)_u \mathbf{r}_v + M_u \mathbf{N}
\end{align}$$

Substitution in expressions from 1 and equating coefficients of $\mathbf{r}_v$ gives
$$\Gamma_{11}^1 \Gamma_{12}^2  + \Gamma_{11}^2 \Gamma_{22}^2
+ L a_{22} + (\Gamma_{11}^2)_v
=
\Gamma_{12}^1 \Gamma_{11}^2
+ \Gamma_{12}^2 \Gamma_{12}^2 + M a_{21}
+ (\Gamma_{12}^2)_u$$
Rearranging gives
$$\begin{align}
\Gamma_{11}^1 \Gamma_{12}^2  + \Gamma_{11}^2 \Gamma_{22}^2
+ (\Gamma_{11}^2)_v
-
\Gamma_{12}^1 \Gamma_{11}^2
- \Gamma_{12}^2 \Gamma_{12}^2
- (\Gamma_{12}^2)_u
& =
+ M a_{21} - L a_{22} \\
& = M \frac{L F - M E}{E G - F^2} - L \frac{M F - N E}{E G - F^2} \\
& = E \frac{L N - M^2}{E G - F^2} \\
& = E K
\end{align}$$
Giving the required expression for the Gaussian Curvature $K$ in terms of coefficients of the first fundamental form and its derivatives, so it is invariant by local isometries.

== See also ==
- Second fundamental form
- Gaussian curvature
- Differential geometry of surfaces
- Carl Friedrich Gauss#Differential geometry
- Gauss–Codazzi equations
