= Curvature of a curve =

Curvature of a curve may refer to:

- Curvature of plane curves
- Curvature of space curves
- Curvature of curves on surfaces
- Geodesic curvature, curvature of curves in Riemannian manifolds, of any dimension
