= Ferdinand Minding =

German-Russian mathematician (1806–1885)

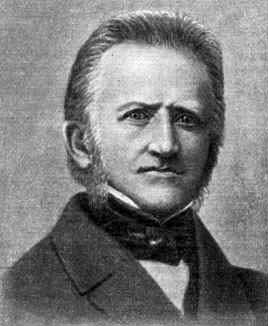
- Born: January 11, 1806; Kalisch, Kingdom of Prussia (present-day Kalisz, Poland)
- Died: May 13, 1885 (aged 79); Dorpat, Governorate of Livonia, Russian Empire
- Citizenship: Russian
- Education: University of Halle
- Known for: Invariance of geodesic curvature, geodesics on pseudosphere, bending of surfaces
- Awards: Demidov Prize of St Peterburg Academy of Sciences (1861)
- Scientific career
- Fields: Mathematics
- Workplaces: University of Berlin, Imperial University of Dorpat
- Thesis: De valore intergralium duplicium quam proxime inveniendo (1829)

Notes
- Birth and death dates are given according to Neue Deutsche Biographie (in Julian and Gregorian calendar)

Ernst Ferdinand Adolf Minding (Russian: Фердинанд Готлибович Миндинг; January 11 1806 [O.S. December 30] – 13 May [O.S. 1 May] 1885) was a German-Russian mathematician known for his contributions to differential geometry. He continued the work of Carl Friedrich Gauss concerning differential geometry of surfaces, especially its intrinsic aspects. Minding considered questions of bending of surfaces and proved the invariance of geodesic curvature. He studied ruled surfaces, developable surfaces and surfaces of revolution and determined geodesics on the pseudosphere. Minding's results on the geometry of geodesic triangles on a surface of constant curvature (1840) anticipated Beltrami's approach to the foundations of non-Euclidean geometry (1868).

== Career ==
Minding was largely self-taught in mathematics. He attended lectures in the University of Halle and eventually graduated with a thesis "De valore intergralium duplicium quam proxime inveniendo" (1829).

Minding worked as a teacher in Elberfeld and as a university lecturer in Berlin. His work on statics drew the attention of Alexander von Humboldt. However, his 1842 bid for election to Berlin Academy, supported by Peter Gustav Lejeune Dirichlet, failed and in 1843 he relocated to the Imperial University of Dorpat, where he was a professor of mathematics for the next 40 years. In Dorpat he taught Karl Peterson and supervised his doctoral thesis that established the Gauss–Bonnet theorem and derived Gauss–Codazzi equations. Minding also worked on differential equations (Demidov prize of the St Petersburg Academy in 1861), algebraic functions, continued fractions and analytical mechanics. His list of publications consists of some 60 titles, including several books. Many of his scientific accomplishments were only recognized properly after his death.
