= Geodesic circle =

A geodesic circle is either "the locus on a surface at a constant geodesic distance from a fixed point" or a curve of constant geodesic curvature. A geodesic disk is the region on a surface bounded by a geodesic circle. In contrast with the ordinary circle and disk, the geodesic circle is not necessarily a plane curve and the geodesic disk is not necessarily a planar surface. They can be used to define Gaussian curvature.
