= Hilbert's lemma =

On curvature of surfaces

Hilbert's lemma was proposed at the end of the 19th century by mathematician David Hilbert. The lemma describes a property of the principal curvatures of surfaces. It may be used to prove Liebmann's theorem that a compact surface with constant Gaussian curvature must be a sphere.

== Statement of the lemma ==
Given a manifold in three dimensions that is smooth and differentiable over a patch containing the point p, where k and m are defined as the principal curvatures and K(x) is the Gaussian curvature at a point x, if k has a max at p, m has a min at p, and k is strictly greater than m at p, then K(p) is a non-positive real number.

== See also ==
- Hilbert's theorem (differential geometry)
