= Gauss–Codazzi equations =

Fundamental formulas linking the metric and curvature tensor of a manifold

In Riemannian geometry and pseudo-Riemannian geometry, the Gauss–Codazzi equations (also called the Gauss–Codazzi–Weingarten-Mainardi equations or Gauss–Peterson–Codazzi formulas) are fundamental formulas that link together the induced metric and second fundamental form of a submanifold of (or immersion into) a Riemannian or pseudo-Riemannian manifold.

The equations were originally discovered in the context of surfaces in three-dimensional Euclidean space. In this context, the first equation, often called the Gauss equation (after its discoverer Carl Friedrich Gauss), says that the Gauss curvature of the surface, at any given point, is dictated by the derivatives of the Gauss map at that point, as encoded by the second fundamental form. The second equation, called the Codazzi equation or Codazzi-Mainardi equation, states that the covariant derivative of the second fundamental form is fully symmetric. It is named for Gaspare Mainardi (1856) and Delfino Codazzi (1868–1869), who independently derived the result, although it was discovered earlier by Karl Mikhailovich Peterson.

== Formal statement ==
Let $i \colon M \to P$ be an embedding of an n-dimensional submanifold M into a Riemannian manifold P of dimension $n+p$. There is a natural inclusion of the tangent bundle of M into that of P by the pushforward, and the cokernel is the normal bundle of M:

$$0 \rightarrow T_xM \rightarrow T_xP|_M \rightarrow T_x^\perp M \rightarrow 0.$$

The metric splits this short exact sequence, and so

$$TP|_M = TM\oplus T^\perp M.$$

Relative to this splitting, the Levi-Civita connection $\nabla'$ of P decomposes into tangential and normal components. For each $X\in TM$ and vector field Y on M,

$$\nabla'_X Y = \top\left(\nabla'_X Y\right) + \bot\left(\nabla'_X Y\right).$$

Let

$$\nabla_X Y = \top\left(\nabla'_X Y\right),\quad \alpha(X, Y) = \bot\left(\nabla'_X Y\right).$$

The Gauss formula now asserts that $\nabla_X$ is the Levi-Civita connection for M, and $\alpha$ is a symmetric vector-valued form with values in the normal bundle. It is often referred to as the second fundamental form.

An immediate corollary is the Gauss equation for the curvature tensor. For $X, Y, Z, W \in TM$,

$$\langle R'(X, Y)Z, W\rangle = \langle R(X, Y)Z, W\rangle + \langle \alpha(X, Z), \alpha(Y, W)\rangle - \langle \alpha(Y, Z), \alpha(X, W)\rangle$$

where $R'$ is the Riemann curvature tensor of P and R is that of M.

The Weingarten equation is an analog of the Gauss formula for a connection in the normal bundle. Let $X \in TM$ and $\xi$ a normal vector field. Then decompose the ambient covariant derivative of $\xi$ along X into tangential and normal components:

$$\nabla'_X\xi = \top \left(\nabla'_X\xi\right) + \bot\left(\nabla'_X\xi\right) = -A_\xi(X) + D_X(\xi).$$

Then

1. Weingarten's equation: $\langle A_\xi X, Y\rangle = \langle \alpha(X, Y), \xi\rangle$
2. D_{X} is a metric connection in the normal bundle.

There are thus a pair of connections: ∇, defined on the tangent bundle of M; and D, defined on the normal bundle of M. These combine to form a connection on any tensor product of copies of TM and T^{⊥}M. In particular, they defined the covariant derivative of $\alpha$:

$$\left(\tilde{\nabla}_X \alpha\right)(Y, Z) = D_X\left(\alpha(Y, Z)\right) - \alpha\left(\nabla_X Y, Z\right) - \alpha\left(Y, \nabla_X Z\right).$$

The Codazzi–Mainardi equation is

$$\bot\left(R'(X, Y)Z\right) = \left(\tilde{\nabla}_X\alpha\right)(Y, Z) - \left(\tilde{\nabla}_Y\alpha\right)(X, Z).$$

Since every immersion is, in particular, a local embedding, the above formulas also hold for immersions.

== Gauss–Codazzi equations in classical differential geometry ==
=== Statement of classical equations ===
In classical differential geometry of surfaces, the Codazzi–Mainardi equations are expressed via the second fundamental form (L, M, N):

$$L_v-M_u = L\Gamma^1{}_{12} + M\left({\Gamma^2}_{12} - {\Gamma^1}_{11}\right) - N{\Gamma^2}_{11}$$
$$M_v-N_u = L\Gamma^1{}_{22} + M\left({\Gamma^2}_{22} - {\Gamma^1}_{12}\right) - N{\Gamma^2}_{12}$$

The Gauss formula, depending on how one chooses to define the Gaussian curvature, may be a tautology. It can be stated as

$$K = \frac{LN - M^2}{eg - f^2},$$

where (e, f, g) are the components of the first fundamental form.

=== Derivation of classical equations ===
Consider a parametric surface in Euclidean 3-space,

$$\mathbf{r}(u,v) = (x(u,v),y(u,v),z(u,v))$$

where the three component functions depend smoothly on ordered pairs (u,v) in some open domain U in the uv-plane. Assume that this surface is regular, meaning that the vectors r_{u} and r_{v} are linearly independent. Complete this to a basis {r_{u},r_{v},n}, by selecting a unit vector n normal to the surface. It is possible to express the second partial derivatives of r (vectors of $\mathbb{R^3}$) with the Christoffel symbols and the elements of the second fundamental form. We choose the first two components of the basis as they are intrinsic to the surface and intend to prove intrinsic property of the Gaussian curvature. The last term in the basis is extrinsic.

$$\mathbf{r}_{uu} = {\Gamma^1}_{11} \mathbf{r}_u + {\Gamma^2}_{11} \mathbf{r}_v + L \mathbf{n}$$
$$\mathbf{r}_{uv} = {\Gamma^1}_{12} \mathbf{r}_u + {\Gamma^2}_{12} \mathbf{r}_v + M \mathbf{n}$$
$$\mathbf{r}_{vv} = {\Gamma^1}_{22} \mathbf{r}_u + {\Gamma^2}_{22} \mathbf{r}_v + N \mathbf{n}$$

Clairaut's theorem states that partial derivatives commute:

$$\left(\mathbf{r}_{uu}\right)_v = \left(\mathbf{r}_{uv}\right)_u$$

If we differentiate r_{uu} with respect to v and r_{uv} with respect to u, we get:

$\left({\Gamma^1}_{11}\right)_v \mathbf{r}_u + {\Gamma^1}_{11} \mathbf{r}_{uv} + \left({\Gamma^2}_{11}\right)_v \mathbf{r}_v + {\Gamma^2}_{11} \mathbf{r}_{vv} + L_v \mathbf{n} + L \mathbf{n}_v$$= \left({\Gamma^1}_{12}\right)_u \mathbf{r}_u + {\Gamma^1}_{12} \mathbf{r}_{uu} + \left(\Gamma_{12}^2\right)_u \mathbf{r}_v + {\Gamma^2}_{12} \mathbf{r}_{uv} + M_u \mathbf{n} + M \mathbf{n}_u$

Now substitute the above expressions for the second derivatives and equate the coefficients of n:

$$M {\Gamma^1}_{11} + N {\Gamma^2}_{11} + L_v = L {\Gamma^1}_{12} + M {\Gamma^2}_{12} + M_u$$

Rearranging this equation gives the first Codazzi–Mainardi equation.

The second equation may be derived similarly.

== Mean curvature ==
Let M be a smooth m-dimensional manifold immersed in the (m + k)-dimensional smooth manifold P. Let $e_1, e_2, \ldots, e_k$ be a local orthonormal frame of vector fields normal to M. Then we can write,

$$\alpha(X, Y) = \sum_{j=1}^k\alpha_j(X, Y)e_j.$$

If, now, $E_1, E_2, \ldots, E_m$ is a local orthonormal frame (of tangent vector fields) on the same open subset of M, then we can define the mean curvatures of the immersion by

$$H_j=\sum_{i=1}^m\alpha_j(E_i, E_i).$$

In particular, if M is a hypersurface of P, i.e. $k=1$, then there is only one mean curvature to speak of. The immersion is called minimal if all the $H_j$ are identically zero.

Observe that the mean curvature is a trace, or average, of the second fundamental form, for any given component. Sometimes mean curvature is defined by multiplying the sum on the right-hand side by $1/m$.

We can now write the Gauss–Codazzi equations as

$$\langle R'(X, Y)Z, W \rangle = \langle R(X,Y)Z, W \rangle + \sum_{j=1}^k \left(\alpha_j(X,Z) \alpha_j(Y, W) - \alpha_j(Y, Z) \alpha_j(X, W)\right).$$

Contracting the $Y, Z$ components gives us

$$\operatorname{Ric}'(X, W) = \operatorname{Ric}(X,W) + \sum_{j=1}^k \langle R'(X, e_j)e_j, W\rangle +  \sum_{j=1}^k  \left(\sum_{i=1}^m\alpha_j(X, E_i) \alpha_j(E_i, W)- H_j \alpha_j(X, W)\right).$$

When M is a hypersurface, this simplifies to

$$\operatorname{Ric}'(X, W) = \operatorname{Ric}(X, W) + \langle R'(X, n)n, W \rangle + \sum_{i=1}^mh(X, E_i) h(E_i, W) - H h(X, W)$$

where $n = e_1,$ $h = \alpha_1$ and $H = H_1$. In that case, one more contraction yields,

$$R' = R + 2 \operatorname{Ric}'(n, n) + \|h\|^2 - H^2$$

where $R'$ and $R$ are the scalar curvatures of P and M respectively, and

$$\|h\|^2 = \sum_{i,j=1}^m h(E_i, E_j)^2.$$

If $k>1$, the scalar curvature equation might be more complicated.

We can already use these equations to draw some conclusions. For example, any minimal immersion into the round sphere $x_1^2 + x_2^2 + \cdots + x_{m+k+1}^2 = 1$ must be of the form

$$\Delta x_j + \lambda x_j = 0$$

where $j$ runs from 1 to $m + k + 1$ and

$$\Delta = \sum_{i=1}^m \nabla_{E_i}\nabla_{E_i}$$

is the Laplacian on M, and $\lambda > 0$ is a positive constant.

== See also ==
- Darboux frame
