= Hilbert's theorem (differential geometry) =

No complete regular surface of constant negative gaussian curvature immerses in R3

In differential geometry, Hilbert's theorem (1901) states that there exists no complete regular surface $S$ of constant negative gaussian curvature $K$ immersed in $\mathbb{R}^{3}$. This theorem answers the question for the negative case of which surfaces in $\mathbb{R}^{3}$ can be obtained by isometrically immersing complete manifolds with constant curvature.

== History ==
- Hilbert's theorem was first treated by David Hilbert in "Über Flächen von konstanter Krümmung" (Trans. Amer. Math. Soc. 2 (1901), 87–99).
- A different proof was given shortly after by E. Holmgren in "Sur les surfaces à courbure constante négative" (1902).
- A far-leading generalization was obtained by Nikolai Efimov in 1975.

== Proof ==
The proof of Hilbert's theorem is elaborate and requires several lemmas. The idea is to show the nonexistence of an isometric immersion

$$\varphi = \psi \circ \exp_p: S' \longrightarrow \mathbb{R}^{3}$$

of a plane $S'$ to the real space $\mathbb{R}^{3}$. This proof is basically the same as in Hilbert's paper, although based in the books of Do Carmo and Spivak.

Observations: In order to have a more manageable treatment, but without loss of generality, the curvature may be considered equal to minus one, $K=-1$. There is no loss of generality, since it is being dealt with constant curvatures, and similarities of $\mathbb{R}^{3}$ multiply $K$ by a constant. The exponential map $\exp_p: T_p(S) \longrightarrow S$ is a local diffeomorphism (in fact a covering map, by Cartan-Hadamard theorem), therefore, it induces an inner product in the tangent space of $S$ at $p$: $T_p(S)$. Furthermore, $S'$ denotes the geometric surface $T_p(S)$ with this inner product. If $\psi:S \longrightarrow \mathbb{R}^{3}$ is an isometric immersion, the same holds for

$$\varphi = \psi \circ \exp_o:S' \longrightarrow \mathbb{R}^{3}$$.

The first lemma is independent from the other ones, and will be used at the end as the counter statement to reject the results from the other lemmas.

Lemma 1: The area of $S'$ is infinite.
Proof's Sketch:
The idea of the proof is to create a global isometry between $H$ and $S'$. Then, since $H$ has an infinite area, $S'$ will have it too.
The fact that the hyperbolic plane $H$ has an infinite area comes by computing the surface integral with the corresponding coefficients of the First fundamental form. To obtain these ones, the hyperbolic plane can be defined as the plane with the following inner product around a point $q\in \mathbb{R}^{2}$ with coordinates $(u,v)$

$$E = \left\langle \frac{\partial}{\partial u}, \frac{\partial}{\partial u} \right\rangle = 1 \qquad F = \left\langle \frac{\partial}{\partial u}, \frac{\partial}{\partial v} \right\rangle = \left\langle \frac{\partial}{\partial v}, \frac{\partial}{\partial u} \right\rangle = 0 \qquad G = \left\langle \frac{\partial}{\partial v}, \frac{\partial}{\partial v} \right\rangle = e^{u}$$

Since the hyperbolic plane is unbounded, the limits of the integral are infinite, and the area can be calculated through

$$\int_{-\infty}^{\infty} \int_{-\infty}^{\infty} e^{u} du dv = \infty$$

Next it is needed to create a map, which will show that the global information from the hyperbolic plane can be transfer to the surface $S'$, i.e. a global isometry. $\varphi: H \rightarrow S'$ will be the map, whose domain is the hyperbolic plane and image the 2-dimensional manifold $S'$, which carries the inner product from the surface $S$ with negative curvature. $\varphi$ will be defined via the exponential map, its inverse, and a linear isometry between their tangent spaces,

$$\psi:T_p(H) \rightarrow T_{p'}(S')$$.

That is

$$\varphi = \exp_{p'} \circ \psi \circ \exp_p^{-1}$$,

where $p\in H, p' \in S'$. That is to say, the starting point $p\in H$ goes to the tangent plane from $H$ through the inverse of the exponential map. Then travels from one tangent plane to the other through the isometry $\psi$, and then down to the surface $S'$ with another exponential map.

The following step involves the use of polar coordinates, $(\rho, \theta)$ and $(\rho', \theta')$, around $p$ and $p'$ respectively. The requirement will be that the axis are mapped to each other, that is $\theta=0$ goes to $\theta'=0$. Then $\varphi$ preserves the first fundamental form.
In a geodesic polar system, the Gaussian curvature $K$ can be expressed as

$$K = - \frac{(\sqrt{G})_{\rho \rho}}{\sqrt{G}}$$.

In addition K is constant and fulfills the following differential equation

$$(\sqrt{G})_{\rho \rho} + K\cdot \sqrt{G} = 0$$

Since $H$ and $S'$ have the same constant Gaussian curvature, then they are locally isometric (Minding's Theorem). That means that $\varphi$ is a local isometry between $H$ and $S'$. Furthermore, from the Hadamard's theorem it follows that $\varphi$ is also a covering map.
Since $S'$ is simply connected, $\varphi$ is a homeomorphism, and hence, a (global) isometry. Therefore, $H$ and $S'$ are globally isometric, and because $H$ has an infinite area, then $S'=T_p(S)$ has an infinite area, as well. $\square$

Lemma 2: For each $p\in S'$ exists a parametrization $x:U \subset \mathbb{R}^{2} \longrightarrow S', \qquad p \in x(U)$, such that the coordinate curves of $x$ are asymptotic curves of $x(U) = V'$ and form a Tchebyshef net.

Lemma 3: Let $V' \subset S'$ be a coordinate neighborhood of $S'$ such that the coordinate curves are asymptotic curves in $V'$. Then the area A of any quadrilateral formed by the coordinate curves is smaller than $2\pi$.

The next goal is to show that $x$ is a parametrization of $S'$.

Lemma 4: For a fixed $t$, the curve $x(s,t), -\infty < s < +\infty$, is an asymptotic curve with $s$ as arc length.

The following 2 lemmas together with lemma 8 will demonstrate the existence of a parametrization $x:\mathbb{R}^{2} \longrightarrow S'$

Lemma 5: $x$ is a local diffeomorphism.

Lemma 6: $x$ is surjective.

Lemma 7: On $S'$ there are two differentiable linearly independent vector fields which are tangent to the asymptotic curves of $S'$.

Lemma 8: $x$ is injective.

Proof of Hilbert's Theorem:
First, it will be assumed that an isometric immersion from a complete surface $S$ with negative curvature exists: $\psi:S \longrightarrow \mathbb{R}^{3}$

As stated in the observations, the tangent plane $T_p(S)$ is endowed with the metric induced by the exponential map $\exp_p: T_p(S) \longrightarrow S$ . Moreover, $\varphi = \psi \circ \exp_p:S' \longrightarrow \mathbb{R}^{3}$ is an isometric immersion and Lemmas 5,6, and 8 show the existence of a parametrization $x:\mathbb{R}^{2} \longrightarrow S'$ of the whole $S'$, such that the coordinate curves of $x$ are the asymptotic curves of $S'$. This result was provided by Lemma 4. Therefore, $S'$ can be covered by a union of "coordinate" quadrilaterals $Q_{n}$ with $Q_{n} \subset Q_{n+1}$. By Lemma 3, the area of each quadrilateral is smaller than $2 \pi$. On the other hand, by Lemma 1, the area of $S'$ is infinite, therefore has no bounds. This is a contradiction and the proof is concluded. $\square$

== See also ==
- Nash embedding theorem, states that every Riemannian manifold can be isometrically embedded into some Euclidean space.
