= Analyst's traveling salesman theorem =

The analyst's traveling salesman problem is an analog of the traveling salesman problem in combinatorial optimization. In its simplest and original form, it asks which plane sets are subsets of rectifiable curves of finite length. Whereas the original traveling salesman problem asks for the shortest way to visit every vertex in a finite set with a discrete path, this analytical version may require the curve to visit infinitely many points.

== β-numbers ==
A rectifiable curve has tangents at almost all of its points, where in this case "almost all" means all but a subset whose one-dimensional Hausdorff measure is zero. Accordingly, if a set is contained in a rectifiable curve, the set must look flat when zooming in on almost all of its points. This suggests that testing us whether a set could be contained in a rectifiable curve must somehow incorporate information about how flat it is when one zooms in on its points at different scales.

This discussion motivates the definition of the following quantity, for a plane set $E\subset\R^2$:

$\beta_{E}(Q)=\frac{1}{l(Q)}\inf\{\delta:{}$there is a line $L$ so that for every $x\in E\cap Q,$ dist$(x,L)<\delta\},$

where $E$ is the set that is to be contained in a rectifiable curve, $Q$ is any square, $l(Q)$ is the side length of $Q$, and dist$(x,L)$ measures the distance from $x$ to the line $L$. Intuitively, $2\beta_E(Q)l(Q)$ is the width of the smallest rectangle containing the portion of $E$ inside $Q$, and hence $\beta_E(Q)$ gives a scale invariant notion of flatness.

== Jones' traveling salesman theorem in R^{2} ==
Let Δ denote the collection of dyadic squares, that is,
$$\Delta=\{[i2^{k},(i+1)2^{k}]\times[j2^{k},(j+1)2^{k}]: i,j,k\in\mathbb{Z}\},$$
where $\mathbb{Z}$ denotes the set of integers. For a set $E\subseteq\mathbb{R}^2$, define
$$\beta(E)=\text{diam} E+ \sum_{Q\in\Delta}\beta_{E}(3Q)^2 l(Q)$$
where diam E is the diameter of E and $3Q$ is the square with same center as $Q$ with side length $3 l(Q)$. Then Peter Jones's analyst's traveling salesman theorem may be stated as follows:

- There is a number C > 0 such that whenever E is a set such that β(E) < ∞, E can be contained in a curve with length no more than Cβ(E).
- Conversely (and substantially more difficult to prove), if Γ is a rectifiable curve, then β(Γ) < CH^{1}(Γ), where H^{1} is the Hausdorff 1-measure

== Generalizations and Menger curvature ==
=== Euclidean space and Hilbert space ===
The Traveling Salesman Theorem was shown to hold in general Euclidean spaces by Kate Okikiolu, that is, the same theorem above holds for sets $E\subseteq\mathbb{R}^d$, d > 1, where Δ is now the collection of dyadic cubes in $\mathbb{R}^d$ defined in a similar way as dyadic squares. In her proof, the constant C grows exponentially with the dimension d.

With some slight modifications to the definition of β(E), Raanan Schul showed Traveling Salesman Theorem also holds for sets E that lie in any Hilbert Space, and in particular, implies the theorems of Jones and Okikiolu, where now the constant C is independent of dimension. (In particular, this involves using β-numbers of balls instead of cubes).

=== Menger curvature and metric spaces ===
Hahlomaa further adjusted the definition of β(E) to get a condition for when a set E of an arbitrary metric space may be contained in the Lipschitz-image of a subset $A\subseteq\mathbb{R}$ of positive measure. For this, he had to redefine the definition of the β-numbers using Menger curvature (since in a metric space there isn't necessarily a notion of a cube or a straight line).

Menger curvature, as in the previous example, can be used to give numerical estimates that determine whether a set contains a rectifiable subset, and the proofs of these results frequently depend on β-numbers.

=== Denjoy–Riesz theorem ===
The Denjoy–Riesz theorem gives general conditions under which a point set can be covered by the homeomorphic image of a curve. This is true, in particular, for every compact totally disconnected subset of the Euclidean plane. However, it may be necessary for such an arc to have infinite length, failing to meet the conditions of the analyst's traveling salesman theorem.
