= Gaspare Mainardi =

Italian mathematician

Gaspare Mainardi (June 1800 in Abbiategrasso, Milan – 9 March 1879 in Lecco) was an Italian mathematician active in differential geometry. He is remembered for the Gauss–Codazzi–Mainardi equations.
