= Menger curvature =

In mathematics, the Menger curvature of a triple of points in n-dimensional Euclidean space R^{n} is the reciprocal of the radius of the circle that passes through the three points. It is named after the Austrian-American mathematician Karl Menger.

== Definition ==
Let x, y and z be three points in R^{n}; for simplicity, assume for the moment that all three points are distinct and do not lie on a single straight line. Let Π ⊆ R^{n} be the Euclidean plane spanned by x, y and z and let C ⊆ Π be the unique Euclidean circle in Π that passes through x, y and z (the circumcircle of x, y and z). Let R be the radius of C. Then the Menger curvature c(x, y, z) of x, y and z is defined by

$$c (x, y, z) = \frac1{R}.$$

If the three points are collinear, R can be informally considered to be +∞, and it makes rigorous sense to define c(x, y, z) = 0. If any of the points x, y and z are coincident, again define c(x, y, z) = 0.

Using the well-known formula relating the side lengths of a triangle to its area, it follows that

$$c (x, y, z) = \frac1{R} = \frac{4 A}{|x - y ||y - z ||z - x |},$$

where A denotes the area of the triangle spanned by x, y and z.

Another way of computing Menger curvature is the identity

$$c(x,y,z)=\frac{2\sin \angle xyz}{|x-z|}$$

where $\angle xyz$ is the angle made at the y-corner of the triangle spanned by x,y,z.

Menger curvature may also be defined on a general metric space. If X is a metric space and x,y, and z are distinct points, let f be an isometry from $\{x,y,z\}$ into $\mathbb{R}^{2}$. Define the Menger curvature of these points to be

$$c_{X} (x,y,z)=c(f(x),f(y),f(z)).$$

Note that f need not be defined on all of X, just on {x,y,z}, and the value c_{X} (x,y,z) is independent of the choice of f.

== Integral Curvature Rectifiability ==
Menger curvature can be used to give quantitative conditions for when sets in $\mathbb{R}^{n}$ may be rectifiable. For a Borel measure $\mu$ on a Euclidean space $\mathbb{R}^{n}$ define

$$c^{p}(\mu)=\int\int\int c(x,y,z)^{p}d\mu(x)d\mu(y)d\mu(z).$$

- A Borel set $E\subseteq \mathbb{R}^{n}$ is rectifiable if $c^{2}(H^{1}|_{E})<\infty$, where $H^{1}|_{E}$ denotes one-dimensional Hausdorff measure restricted to the set $E$.

The basic intuition behind the result is that Menger curvature measures how straight a given triple of points are (the smaller $c(x,y,z)\max\{|x-y|,|y-z|,|z-y|\}$ is, the closer x,y, and z are to being collinear), and this integral quantity being finite is saying that the set E is flat on most small scales. In particular, if the power in the integral is larger, our set is smoother than just being rectifiable

- Let $p>3$, $f:S^{1}\rightarrow \mathbb{R}^{n}$ be a homeomorphism and $\Gamma=f(S^{1})$. Then $f\in C^{1,1-\frac{3}{p}}(S^{1})$ if $c^{p}(H^{1}|_{\Gamma})<\infty$.
- If $0<H^{s}(E)<\infty$ where $0<s\leq\frac{1}{2}$, and $c^{2s}(H^{s}|_{E})<\infty$, then $E$ is rectifiable in the sense that there are countably many $C^{1}$ curves $\Gamma_{i}$ such that $H^{s}(E\backslash \bigcup\Gamma_{i})=0$. The result is not true for $\frac{1}{2}<s<1$, and $c^{2s}(H^{s}|_{E})=\infty$ for $1<s\leq n$.:

In the opposite direction, there is a result of Peter Jones:

- If $E\subseteq\Gamma\subseteq\mathbb{R}^{2}$, $H^{1}(E)>0$, and $\Gamma$ is rectifiable. Then there is a positive Radon measure $\mu$ supported on $E$ satisfying $\mu B(x,r)\leq r$ for all $x\in E$ and $r>0$ such that $c^{2}(\mu)<\infty$ (in particular, this measure is the Frostman measure associated to E). Moreover, if $H^{1}(B(x,r)\cap\Gamma)\leq Cr$ for some constant C and all $x\in \Gamma$ and r>0, then $c^{2}(H^{1}|_{E})<\infty$. This last result follows from the Analyst's Traveling Salesman Theorem.

Analogous results hold in general metric spaces:

== See also ==
- Menger-Melnikov curvature of a measure
