= Curvature of a measure =

In mathematics, the curvature of a measure defined on the Euclidean plane R^{2} is a quantification of how much the measure's "distribution of mass" is "curved". It is related to notions of curvature in geometry. In the form presented below, the concept was introduced in 1995 by the mathematician Mark S. Melnikov; accordingly, it may be referred to as the Melnikov curvature or Menger-Melnikov curvature. Melnikov and Verdera (1995) established a powerful connection between the curvature of measures and the Cauchy kernel.

== Definition ==
Let μ be a Borel measure on the Euclidean plane R^{2}. Given three (distinct) points x, y and z in R^{2}, let R(x, y, z) be the radius of the Euclidean circle that joins all three of them, or +∞ if they are collinear. The Menger curvature c(x, y, z) is defined to be

$$c(x, y, z) = \frac{1}{R(x, y, z)},$$

with the natural convention that c(x, y, z) = 0 if x, y and z are collinear. It is also conventional to extend this definition by setting c(x, y, z) = 0 if any of the points x, y and z coincide. The Menger-Melnikov curvature c^{2}(μ) of μ is defined to be

$$c^{2} (\mu) = \iiint_{\mathbb{R}^{2}} c(x, y, z)^{2} \, \mathrm{d} \mu (x) \mathrm{d} \mu (y) \mathrm{d} \mu (z).$$

More generally, for α ≥ 0, define c^{2α}(μ) by

$$c^{2 \alpha} (\mu) = \iiint_{\mathbb{R}^{2}} c(x, y, z)^{2 \alpha} \, \mathrm{d} \mu (x) \mathrm{d} \mu (y) \mathrm{d} \mu (z).$$

One may also refer to the curvature of μ at a given point x:

$$c^{2} (\mu; x) = \iint_{\mathbb{R}^{2}} c(x, y, z)^{2} \, \mathrm{d} \mu (y) \mathrm{d} \mu (z),$$

in which case

$$c^{2} (\mu) = \int_{\mathbb{R}^{2}} c^{2} (\mu; x) \, \mathrm{d} \mu (x).$$

== Examples ==
- The trivial measure has zero curvature.
- A Dirac measure δ_{a} supported at any point a has zero curvature.
- If μ is any measure whose support is contained within a Euclidean line L, then μ has zero curvature. For example, one-dimensional Lebesgue measure on any line (or line segment) has zero curvature.
- The Lebesgue measure defined on all of R^{2} has infinite curvature.
- If μ is the uniform one-dimensional Hausdorff measure on a circle C_{r} or radius r, then μ has curvature 1/r.

== Relationship to the Cauchy kernel ==
In this section, R^{2} is thought of as the complex plane C. Melnikov and Verdera (1995) showed the precise relation of the boundedness of the Cauchy kernel to the curvature of measures. They proved that if there is some constant C_{0} such that

$$\mu(B_{r} (x)) \leq C_{0} r$$

for all x in C and all r > 0, then there is another constant C, depending only on C_{0}, such that

$$\left| 6 \int_{\mathbb{C}} | \mathcal{C}_{\varepsilon} (\mu) (z) |^{2} \, \mathrm{d} \mu (z) - c_{\varepsilon}^{2} (\mu) \right| \leq C \| \mu \|$$

for all ε > 0. Here c_{ε} denotes a truncated version of the Menger-Melnikov curvature in which the integral is taken only over those points x, y and z such that

$$| x - y | > \varepsilon;$$
$$| y - z | > \varepsilon;$$
$$| z - x | > \varepsilon.$$

Similarly, $\mathcal{C}_{\varepsilon}$ denotes a truncated Cauchy integral operator: for a measure μ on C and a point z in C, define

$$\mathcal{C}_{\varepsilon} (\mu) (z) = \int \frac{1}{\xi - z} \, \mathrm{d} \mu (\xi),$$

where the integral is taken over those points ξ in C with

$$| \xi - z | > \varepsilon.$$
