= Karl Mikhailovich Peterson =

Russian mathematician (1828–1881)

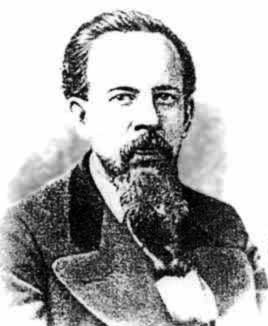
- Born: May 25, 1828; Riga, Russian Empire
- Died: April 19, 1881 (aged 52); Moscow, Russian Empire
- Education: Imperial University of Dorpat
- Known for: Peterson–Codazzi equations
- Scientific career
- Fields: Mathematics
- Thesis: Über die Biegung der Flächen (On the bending of surfaces) (1853)
- Doctoral advisor: Ferdinand Minding

Karl Mikhailovich Peterson (Russian: Карл Михайлович Петерсон; 25 May 1828 – 1 May 1881) was a Russian mathematician, known by an earlier formulation of the Gauss–Codazzi equations.

== Life and work ==
Peterson was born in a peasant family. He studied at the Gymnasium of Riga and, after, at the Imperial University of Dorpat (now Tartu) under Ferdinand Minding.

Nothing of his life is known about the ten years after his graduation. In unknown date he went to Moscow where he taught in the German Gymnasium Peter and Paul of this city from 1865. Peterson never had an academic position at university level, but he was one of the founders of the Moscow Mathematical Society with Nikolai Brashman and August Davidov. Peterson was a notable collaborator in the journal of the Society and he is considered the founder of the Moscow school of geometry.

Peterson gave, in his graduation dissertation (1853, but not published until later), an earliest formulation of the fundamental equations of the surface theory, now usually known as Gauss–Codazzi equations, sometimes Peterson–Codazzi equations.

During his time in Moscow, Peterson published some important papers about differential geometry. In 1879, the university of Odessa awarded him an honorary degree.

== Bibliography ==
- Laptev, B.L.; Rozenfeld, B.A. (1996). "Geometry". In Andrei N. Kolmogorov; Adolf Andrei P. Yushkevich (eds.). Mathematics of the 19th Century: Geometry, Analytic Function Theory. Birkhäuser. pp. 1–118. ISBN 0-8176-5048-2.
- Phillips, Esther R. (1979). "Karl M. Peterson: The earliest derivation of the Mainardi–Codazzi equations and the fundamental theorem of surface theory". Historia Mathematica. 6 (2): 137–163. doi:10.1016/0315-0860(79)90075-2. ISSN 0315-0860.
- Reich, Karin (1994). "Differential Geometry". In Ivor Grattan-Guinness (ed.). Companion Encyclopedia of the History and Philosophy of the Mathematical Sciences. Routledge. pp. 331–341. ISBN 0-415-09238-8.
