= Third fundamental form =

In differential geometry, the third fundamental form is a surface metric denoted by $\mathrm{I\!I\!I}$. Unlike the second fundamental form, it is independent of the surface normal.

== Definition ==
Let S be the shape operator and M be a smooth surface. Also, let u_{p} and v_{p} be elements of the tangent space T_{p}(M). The third fundamental form is then given by

$$\mathrm{I\!I\!I}(\mathbf{u}_p,\mathbf{v}_p)=S(\mathbf{u}_p)\cdot S(\mathbf{v}_p)\,.$$

== Properties ==
The third fundamental form is expressible entirely in terms of the first fundamental form and second fundamental form. If we let H be the mean curvature of the surface and K be the Gaussian curvature of the surface, we have

$$\mathrm{I\!I\!I}-2H\mathrm{I\!I}+K\mathrm{I}=0\,.$$

As the shape operator is self-adjoint, for u,v ∈ T_{p}(M), we find

$$\mathrm{I\!I\!I}(u,v)=\langle Su,Sv\rangle=\langle u,S^2v\rangle=\langle S^2u,v\rangle\,.$$

== See also ==
- Metric tensor
- First fundamental form
- Second fundamental form
- Tautological one-form
