= Julius Weingarten =

German mathematician

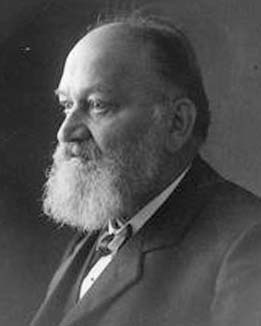
- Born: 2 March 1836; Berlin
- Died: 16 June 1910 (aged 74); Freiburg im Breisgau
- Education: Martin-Luther-Universität Halle-Wittenberg
- Known for: Weingarten equations
- Scientific career
- Fields: Mathematics
- Doctoral students: Paul Stäckel

Julius Weingarten (2 March 1836 – 16 June 1910) was a German mathematician. He received his doctorate in 1864 from Martin-Luther-Universität Halle-Wittenberg. He made some important contributions to the differential geometry of surfaces, such as the Weingarten equations.
