= Geodesic curvature =

Mathematical measure in Riemannian geometry

In Riemannian geometry, the geodesic curvature $k_g$ of a curve $\gamma$ measures how far the curve is from being a geodesic. For example, for 1D curves on a 2D surface embedded in 3D space, it is the curvature of the curve projected onto the surface's tangent plane. More generally, in a given manifold $\bar{M}$, the geodesic curvature is just the usual curvature of $\gamma$ (see below). However, when the curve $\gamma$ is restricted to lie on a submanifold $M$ of $\bar{M}$ (e.g. for curves on surfaces), geodesic curvature refers to the curvature of $\gamma$ in $M$ and it is different in general from the curvature of $\gamma$ in the ambient manifold $\bar{M}$. The (ambient) curvature $k$ of $\gamma$ depends on two factors: the curvature of the submanifold $M$ in the direction of $\gamma$ (the normal curvature $k_n$), which depends only on the direction of the curve, and the curvature of $\gamma$ seen in $M$ (the geodesic curvature $k_g$), which is a second order quantity. The relation between these is $k = \sqrt{k_g^2+k_n^2}$. In particular geodesics on $M$ have zero geodesic curvature (they are "straight"), so that $k=k_n$, which explains why they appear to be curved in ambient space whenever the submanifold is.

== Definition ==
Consider a curve $\gamma$ in a manifold $\bar{M}$, parametrized by arclength, with unit tangent vector $T=d\gamma/ds$. Its curvature is the norm of the covariant derivative of $T$: $k = \|DT/ds \|$. If $\gamma$ lies on $M$, the geodesic curvature is the norm of the projection of the covariant derivative $DT/ds$ on the tangent space to the submanifold. Conversely the normal curvature is the norm of the projection of $DT/ds$ on the normal bundle to the submanifold at the point considered.

If the ambient manifold is the euclidean space $\mathbb{R}^n$, then the covariant derivative $DT/ds$ is just the usual derivative $dT/ds$.

If $\gamma$ is unit-speed, i.e. $\|\gamma'(s)\|=1$, and $N$ designates the unit normal field of $M$ along $\gamma$, the geodesic curvature is given by

$$k_g
= \gamma''(s) \cdot
\Big( N( \gamma(s)) \times \gamma'(s) \Big)
= \left[ \frac{\mathrm{d}^2 \gamma(s)}{\mathrm{d}s^2} ,
N(\gamma(s)) , \frac{\mathrm{d}\gamma(s)}{\mathrm{d}s} \right]\,,$$

where the square brackets denote the scalar triple product.

== Example ==
Let $M$ be the unit sphere $S^2$ in three-dimensional Euclidean space. The normal curvature of $S^2$ is identically 1, independently of the direction considered. Great circles have curvature $k=1$, so they have zero geodesic curvature, and are therefore geodesics. Smaller circles of radius $r$ will have curvature $1/r$ and geodesic curvature $k_g = \frac{\sqrt{1-r^2}}{r}$.

== Some results involving geodesic curvature ==
- The geodesic curvature is none other than the usual curvature of the curve when computed intrinsically in the submanifold $M$. It does not depend on the way the submanifold $M$ sits in $\bar{M}$.
- Geodesics of $M$ have zero geodesic curvature, which is equivalent to saying that $DT/ds$ is orthogonal to the tangent space to $M$.
- On the other hand the normal curvature depends strongly on how the submanifold lies in the ambient space, but marginally on the curve: $k_n$ only depends on the point on the submanifold and the direction $T$, but not on $DT/ds$.
- In general Riemannian geometry, the derivative is computed using the Levi-Civita connection $\bar{\nabla}$ of the ambient manifold: $DT/ds = \bar{\nabla}_T T$. It splits into a tangent part and a normal part to the submanifold: $\bar{\nabla}_T T = \nabla_T T + (\bar{\nabla}_T T)^\perp$. The tangent part is the usual derivative $\nabla_T T$ in $M$ (it is a particular case of Gauss equation in the Gauss-Codazzi equations), while the normal part is $\mathrm{I\!I}(T,T)$, where $\mathrm{I\!I}$ denotes the second fundamental form.
- The Gauss–Bonnet theorem.

== See also ==
- Curvature
- Darboux frame
- Gauss–Codazzi equations
