= Weingarten equations =

Equations used in vector calculus

The Weingarten equations give the expansion of the derivative of the unit normal vector to a surface in terms of the first derivatives of the position vector of a point on the surface. These formulas were established in 1861 by the German mathematician Julius Weingarten.

== Statement in classical differential geometry ==
Let S be a surface in three-dimensional Euclidean space that is parametrized by the position vector r(u, v). Let P = P(u, v) be a point on the surface. Then

$$\mathbf{r}_{u} = \frac {\partial \mathbf{r}} {\partial u}, \quad \mathbf{r}_{v} = \frac {\partial \mathbf{r}} {\partial v}$$

are two tangent vectors at point P.

Let n(u, v) be the unit normal vector and let (E, F, G) and (L, M, N) be the coefficients of the first and second fundamental forms of this surface, respectively. The Weingarten equation gives the first derivative of the unit normal vector n at point P in terms of the tangent vectors r_{u} and r_{v}:

$$\mathbf{n}_u = \frac {FM-GL} {EG-F^2} \mathbf{r}_u + \frac {FL-EM} {EG-F^2} \mathbf{r}_v$$

$$\mathbf{n}_v = \frac {FN-GM} {EG-F^2} \mathbf{r}_u + \frac {FM-EN} {EG-F^2} \mathbf{r}_v$$

This can be expressed compactly in index notation as

$$\partial_a \mathbf{n} = K_a^{~b} \mathbf{r}_{b}$$,

where K_{ab} are the components of the surface's second fundamental form (shape tensor).
