= Parametric surface =

Surface specified with parameters

A parametric surface is a surface in the Euclidean space $\R^3$ which is defined by a parametric equation with two parameters $\mathbf r: \R^2 \to \R^3$. Parametric representation is a very general way to specify a surface, as well as implicit representation. Surfaces that occur in two of the main theorems of vector calculus, Stokes' theorem, and the divergence theorem, are frequently given in a parametric form. The curvature and arc length of curves on the surface, surface area, differential geometric invariants such as the first and second fundamental forms, Gaussian, mean, and principal curvatures can all be computed from a given parametrization.

== Examples ==
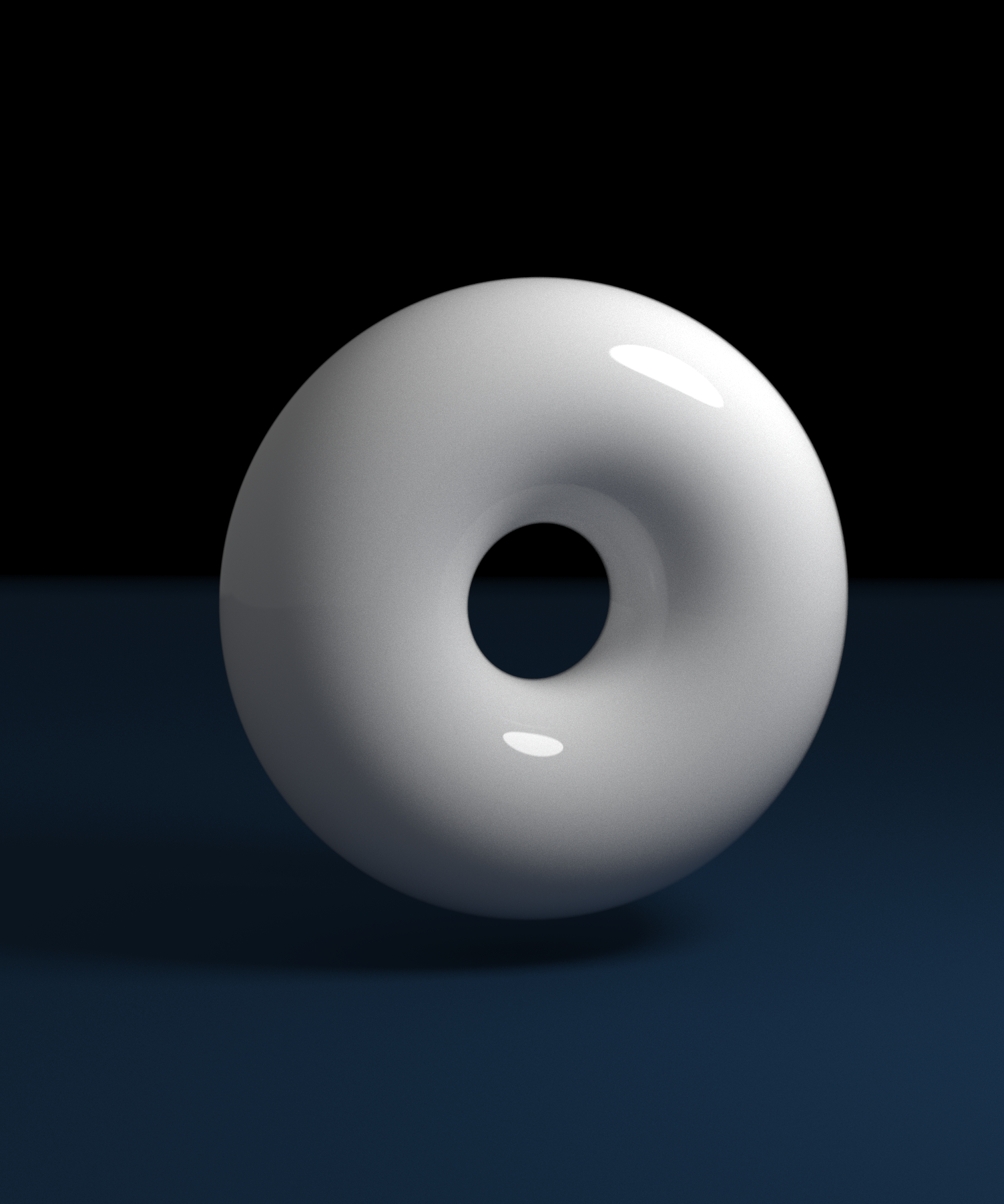
Torus, created with equations: $$\begin{align} x &= r \sin v \\ y &= (R + r\cos v) \sin u \\ z &= (R + r\cos v)\cos u \end{align}$$

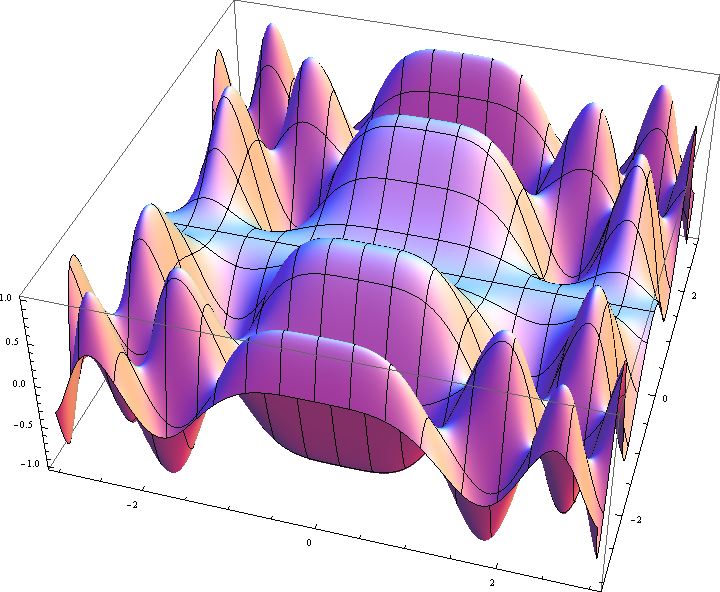
Graph of the function $f(x, y) = \sin\left(x^2\right) \cdot \cos\left(y^2\right).$

- The simplest type of parametric surfaces is a bivariate surface, given by the graphs of functions of two variables (bivariate functions):
  $$z = f(x,y), \quad \mathbf r(x,y) = (x, y, f(x,y)).$$
- A rational surface is a surface that admits parameterizations by a rational function. A rational surface is an algebraic surface. Given an algebraic surface, it is commonly easier to decide if it is rational than to compute its rational parameterization, if it exists.
- Surfaces of revolution give another important class of surfaces that can be easily parametrized. If the graph z = f(x), a ≤ x ≤ b is rotated about the z-axis then the resulting surface has a parametrization
  $$\mathbf r(u,\phi) = (u\cos\phi, u\sin\phi, f(u)), \quad a\leq u\leq b, 0\leq\phi <  2\pi.$$
  It may also be parameterized
  $$\mathbf r(u,v) = \left(u\frac{1-v^2}{1+v^2}, u\frac{2v}{1+v^2}, f(u)\right), \quad a\leq u\leq b,$$
  showing that, if the function f is rational, then the surface is rational.
- The straight circular cylinder of radius R about x-axis has the following parametric representation:
  $$\mathbf r(x, \phi) = (x, R\cos\phi, R\sin\phi).$$
- Using the spherical coordinates, the unit sphere can be parameterized by
  $$\mathbf r(\theta,\phi) = (\cos\theta \sin\phi, \sin\theta \sin \phi, \cos\phi), \quad 0 \leq \theta < 2\pi, 0 \leq \phi \leq \pi.$$
  This parametrization breaks down at the north and south poles where the azimuth angle θ is not determined uniquely. The sphere is a rational surface.

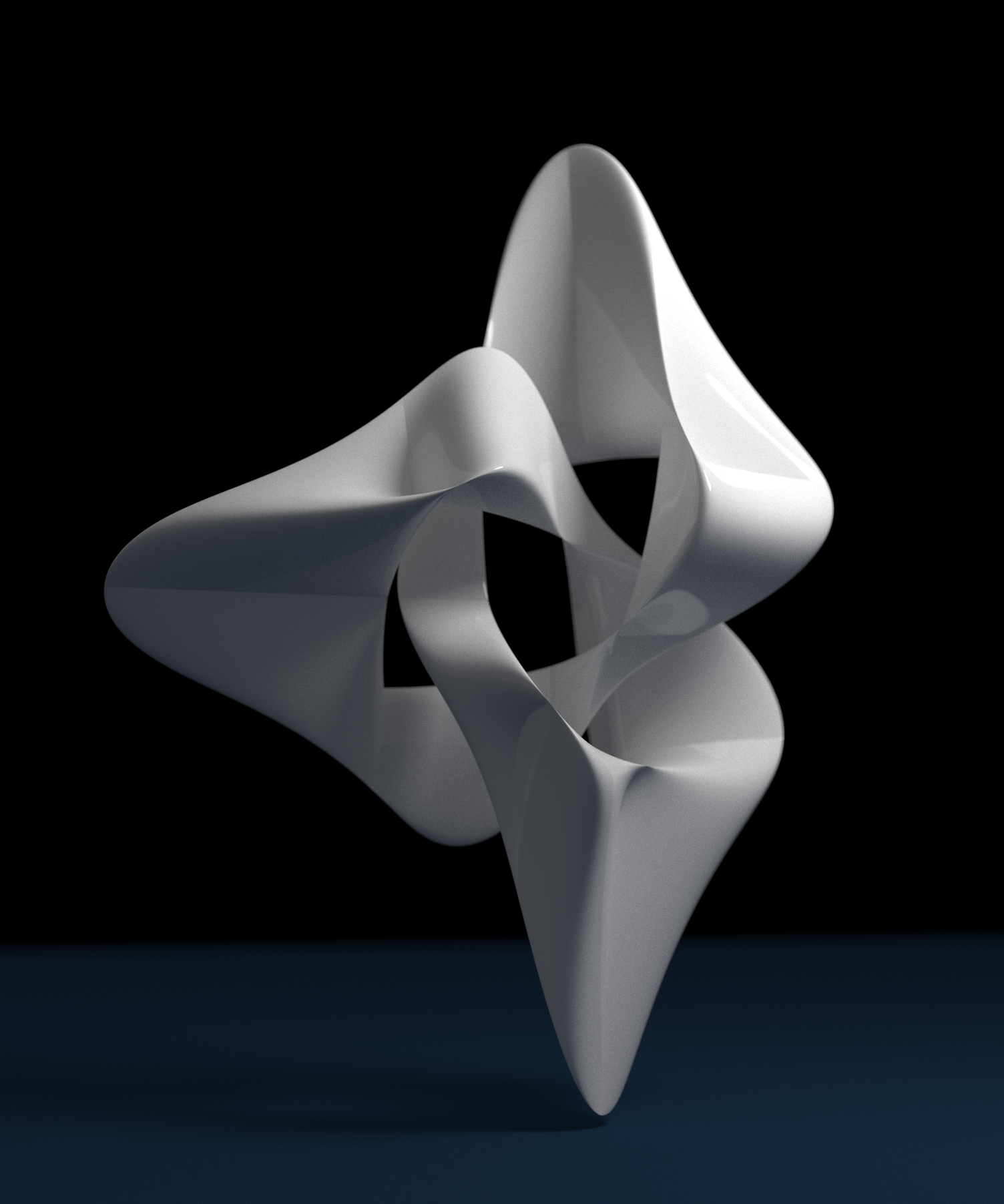
Parametric surface forming a trefoil knot, equation details in the attached source code.

The same surface admits many different parametrizations. For example, the coordinate z-plane can be parametrized as
$$\mathbf r(u,v)=(au+bv, cu+dv, 0)$$
for any constants a, b, c, d such that ad − bc ≠ 0, i.e. the matrix
$$\begin{bmatrix}a & b\\ c & d\end{bmatrix}$$
is invertible.

== Local differential geometry ==
The local shape of a parametric surface can be analyzed by considering the Taylor expansion of the function that parametrizes it. The arc length of a curve on the surface and the surface area can be found using integration.

=== Notation ===
Let the parametric surface be given by the equation
$$\mathbf{r}=\mathbf{r}(u,v),$$
where $\mathbf{r}$ is a vector-valued function of the parameters (u, v) and the parameters vary within a certain domain D in the parametric uv-plane. The first partial derivatives with respect to the parameters are usually denoted $\mathbf{r}_u := \frac{\partial\mathbf{r}}{\partial u}$ and $\mathbf{r}_v,$ and similarly for the higher derivatives, $\mathbf{r}_{uu}, \mathbf{r}_{uv}, \mathbf{r}_{vv}.$

In vector calculus, the parameters are frequently denoted (s,t) and the partial derivatives are written out using the ∂-notation:
$$\frac{\partial\mathbf{r}}{\partial s},
\frac{\partial\mathbf{r}}{\partial t},
\frac{\partial^2\mathbf{r}}{\partial s^2},
\frac{\partial^2\mathbf{r}}{\partial s\partial t},
\frac{\partial^2\mathbf{r}}{\partial t^2}.$$

=== Tangent plane and normal vector ===
The parametrization is regular for the given values of the parameters if the vectors
$$\mathbf{r}_u, \mathbf{r}_v$$
are linearly independent. The tangent plane at a regular point is the affine plane in R^{3} spanned by these vectors and passing through the point r(u, v) on the surface determined by the parameters. Any tangent vector can be uniquely decomposed into a linear combination of $\mathbf{r}_u$ and $\mathbf{r}_v.$ The cross product of these vectors is a normal vector to the tangent plane. Dividing this vector by its length yields a unit normal vector to the parametrized surface at a regular point:
$$\hat\mathbf{n}=\frac{\mathbf{r}_u\times\mathbf{r}_v}{\left|\mathbf{r}_u\times\mathbf{r}_v\right|}.$$

In general, there are two choices of the unit normal vector to a surface at a given point, but for a regular parametrized surface, the preceding formula consistently picks one of them, and thus determines an orientation of the surface. Some of the differential-geometric invariants of a surface in R^{3} are defined by the surface itself and are independent of the orientation, while others change the sign if the orientation is reversed.

=== Surface area ===
The surface area can be calculated by integrating the length of the normal vector $\mathbf{r}_u\times\mathbf{r}_v$ to the surface over the appropriate region D in the parametric uv plane:
$$A(D) = \iint_D\left |\mathbf{r}_u\times\mathbf{r}_v \right | du \, dv.$$

Although this formula provides a closed expression for the surface area, for all but very special surfaces this results in a complicated double integral, which is typically evaluated using a computer algebra system or approximated numerically. Fortunately, many common surfaces form exceptions, and their areas are explicitly known. This is true for a circular cylinder, sphere, cone, torus, and a few other surfaces of revolution.

This can also be expressed as a surface integral over the scalar field 1:
$$\int_S 1 \,dS.$$

=== First fundamental form ===
The first fundamental form is a quadratic form
$$\mathrm{I} = E\,du^2 + 2\,F\,du\,dv + G\,dv^2$$
on the tangent plane to the surface which is used to calculate distances and angles. For a parametrized surface $\mathbf r=\mathbf r(u,v),$ its coefficients can be computed as follows:
$$E=\mathbf r_u \cdot \mathbf r_u, \quad
F=\mathbf r_u \cdot \mathbf r_v, \quad
G=\mathbf r_v \cdot \mathbf r_v.$$

Arc length of parametrized curves on the surface S, the angle between curves on S, and the surface area all admit expressions in terms of the first fundamental form.

If (u(t), v(t)), a ≤ t ≤ b represents a parametrized curve on this surface then its arc length can be calculated as the integral:
$$\int_a^b \sqrt{E\,u'(t)^2 + 2F\,u'(t)v'(t) + G\,v'(t)^2}\, dt.$$

The first fundamental form may be viewed as a family of positive definite symmetric bilinear forms on the tangent plane at each point of the surface depending smoothly on the point. This perspective helps one calculate the angle between two curves on S intersecting at a given point. This angle is equal to the angle between the tangent vectors to the curves. The first fundamental form evaluated on this pair of vectors is their dot product, and the angle can be found from the standard formula
$$\cos \theta = \frac{\mathbf{a}\cdot\mathbf{b}}{\left|\mathbf{a}\right| \left|\mathbf{b}\right|}$$
expressing the cosine of the angle via the dot product.

Surface area can be expressed in terms of the first fundamental form as follows:
$$A(D) = \iint_D \sqrt{EG-F^2}\, du\,dv.$$

By Lagrange's identity, the expression under the square root is precisely $\left|\mathbf{r}_u\times\mathbf{r}_v\right|^2$, and so it is strictly positive at the regular points.

=== Second fundamental form ===
The second fundamental form
$$\mathrm{I\!I} = L \, du^2 + 2M \, du \, dv + N \, dv^2$$
is a quadratic form on the tangent plane to the surface that, together with the first fundamental form, determines the curvatures of curves on the surface. In the special case when (u, v) = (x, y) and the tangent plane to the surface at the given point is horizontal, the second fundamental form is essentially the quadratic part of the Taylor expansion of z as a function of x and y.

For a general parametric surface, the definition is more complicated, but the second fundamental form depends only on the partial derivatives of order one and two. Its coefficients are defined to be the projections of the second partial derivatives of $\mathbf{r}$ onto the unit normal vector $\hat\mathbf{n}$ defined by the parametrization:
$$L = \mathbf r_{uu} \cdot \hat\mathbf n, \quad
M = \mathbf r_{uv} \cdot \hat\mathbf n, \quad
N = \mathbf r_{vv} \cdot \hat\mathbf n.$$

Like the first fundamental form, the second fundamental form may be viewed as a family of symmetric bilinear forms on the tangent plane at each point of the surface depending smoothly on the point.

=== Curvature ===
The first and second fundamental forms of a surface determine its important differential-geometric invariants: the Gaussian curvature, the mean curvature, and the principal curvatures.

The principal curvatures are the invariants of the pair consisting of the second and first fundamental forms. They are the roots κ_{1}, κ_{2} of the quadratic equation
$$\det(\mathrm{I\!I}-\kappa\mathrm{I})=0, \quad
\det\begin{bmatrix}L-\kappa E & M-\kappa F \\ M-\kappa F & N-\kappa G \end{bmatrix} = 0.$$

The Gaussian curvature K = κ_{1}κ_{2} and the mean curvature H = (κ_{1} + κ_{2})/2 can be computed as follows:
$$K=\frac{LN-M^2}{EG-F^2}, \quad H=\frac{EN-2FM+GL}{2(EG-F^2)}.$$

Up to a sign, these quantities are independent of the parametrization used, and hence form important tools for analysing the geometry of the surface. More precisely, the principal curvatures and the mean curvature change the sign if the orientation of the surface is reversed, and the Gaussian curvature is entirely independent of the parametrization.

The sign of the Gaussian curvature at a point determines the shape of the surface near that point: for K > 0 the surface is locally convex and the point is called elliptic, while for K < 0 the surface is saddle shaped and the point is called hyperbolic. The points at which the Gaussian curvature is zero are called parabolic. In general, parabolic points form a curve on the surface called the parabolic line. The first fundamental form is positive definite, hence its determinant EG − F^{2} is positive everywhere. Therefore, the sign of K coincides with the sign of LN − M^{2}, the determinant of the second fundamental.

The coefficients of the first fundamental form presented above may be organized in a symmetric matrix:
$$F_1=\begin{bmatrix}E & F \\F & G \end{bmatrix}.$$
And the same for the coefficients of the second fundamental form, also presented above:
$$F_2=\begin{bmatrix}L & M \\M & N \end{bmatrix}.$$

Defining now matrix $A = F_1^{-1} F_2$, the principal curvatures κ_{1} and κ_{2} are the eigenvalues of A.

Now, if v_{1} = (v_{11}, v_{12}) is the eigenvector of A corresponding to principal curvature κ_{1}, the unit vector in the direction of $\mathbf t_1=v_{11} \mathbf r_u + v_{12} \mathbf r_v$ is called the principal vector corresponding to the principal curvature κ_{1}.

Accordingly, if v_{2} = (v_{21},v_{22}) is the eigenvector of A corresponding to principal curvature κ_{2}, the unit vector in the direction of $\mathbf t_2=v_{21} \mathbf r_u + v_{22} \mathbf r_v$ is called the principal vector corresponding to the principal curvature κ_{2}.

== See also ==
- List of mathematical art software
- Spline (mathematics)
- Surface normal
