= First fundamental form =

Inner product of a surface in 3D, induced by the dot product

In differential geometry, the first fundamental form is the inner product on the tangent space of a surface in three-dimensional Euclidean space which is induced canonically from the dot product of R^{3}. It permits the calculation of curvature and metric properties of a surface such as length and area in a manner consistent with the ambient space. The first fundamental form is denoted by the Roman numeral I,
$$\mathrm{I}(x,y)= \langle x,y \rangle.$$

== Definition ==
Let X(u, v) be a parametric surface. Then the inner product of two tangent vectors is
$$\begin{align}
& \mathrm{I}(aX_u+bX_v,cX_u+dX_v) \\[5pt]
= {} & ac \langle X_u,X_u \rangle + (ad+bc) \langle X_u,X_v \rangle + bd \langle X_v,X_v \rangle \\[5pt]
= {} & Eac + F(ad+bc) + Gbd,
\end{align}$$
where E, F, and G are the coefficients of the first fundamental form.

The first fundamental form may be represented as a symmetric matrix.
$$\mathrm{I}(x,y) = x^\mathsf{T}
\begin{bmatrix}
E & F \\
F & G
\end{bmatrix}y$$

== Further notation ==
When the first fundamental form is written with only one argument, it denotes the inner product of that vector with itself.
$$\mathrm{I}(v)= \langle v,v \rangle = |v|^2$$

The first fundamental form is often written in the modern notation of the metric tensor. The coefficients may then be written as g_{ij}:
$$\left(g_{ij}\right) = \begin{pmatrix}
g_{11} & g_{12} \\
g_{21} & g_{22}
\end{pmatrix} =\begin{pmatrix}
E & F \\
F & G
\end{pmatrix}$$

The components of this tensor are calculated as the scalar product of tangent vectors X_{1} and X_{2}:
$$g_{ij} = \langle X_i, X_j \rangle$$
for i, j = 1, 2. See example below.

== Calculating lengths and areas ==
The first fundamental form completely describes the metric properties of a surface. Thus, it enables one to calculate the lengths of curves on the surface and the areas of regions on the surface. The line element ds may be expressed in terms of the coefficients of the first fundamental form as
$$ds^2 = E\,du^2+2F\,du\,dv+G\,dv^2 \,.$$

The classical area element given by dA = |X_{u} × X_{v}| du dv can be expressed in terms of the first fundamental form with the assistance of Lagrange's identity,
$$dA = |X_u \times X_v| \ du\, dv= \sqrt{ \langle X_u,X_u \rangle \langle X_v,X_v \rangle - \left\langle X_u,X_v \right\rangle^2 } \, du\, dv = \sqrt{EG-F^2} \, du\, dv.$$

=== Example: curve on a sphere ===
A spherical curve on the unit sphere in R^{3} may be parametrized as
$$X(u,v) = \begin{bmatrix} \cos u \sin v \\ \sin u \sin v \\ \cos v \end{bmatrix},\ (u,v) \in [0,2\pi) \times [0,\pi].$$
Differentiating X(u,v) with respect to u and v yields
$$\begin{align}
X_u &= \begin{bmatrix} -\sin u \sin v \\ \cos u \sin v \\ 0 \end{bmatrix},\\[5pt]
X_v &= \begin{bmatrix} \cos u \cos v \\ \sin u \cos v \\ -\sin v \end{bmatrix}.
\end{align}$$
The coefficients of the first fundamental form may be found by taking the dot product of the partial derivatives.

$$\begin{align}
E &= X_u \cdot X_u = \sin^2 v \\
F &= X_u \cdot X_v = 0 \\
G &= X_v \cdot X_v = 1
\end{align}$$
so:
$$\begin{bmatrix}E & F \\F & G\end{bmatrix} =\begin{bmatrix} \sin^2 v & 0 \\0 & 1\end{bmatrix}.$$

==== Length of a curve on the sphere ====
The equator of the unit sphere is a parametrized curve given by
$$(u(t),v(t))=(t,\tfrac{\pi}{2})$$
with t ranging from 0 to 2π. The line element may be used to calculate the length of this curve.

$$\int_0^{2\pi} \sqrt{ E\left(\frac{du}{dt}\right)^2 + 2F \frac{du}{dt} \frac{dv}{dt} + G\left(\frac{dv}{dt}\right)^2 } \,dt = \int_0^{2\pi} \left|\sin v\right| \, dt = 2\pi \sin \tfrac{\pi}{2} = 2\pi$$

==== Area of a region on the sphere ====
The area element may be used to calculate the area of the unit sphere.

$$\int_0^\pi \int_0^{2\pi} \sqrt{ EG-F^2 } \ du\, dv = \int_0^\pi \int_0^{2\pi} \sin v \, du\, dv = 2\pi \Big[ {-\cos v} \Big]_0^{\pi} = 4\pi$$

== Gaussian curvature ==
The Gaussian curvature of a surface is given by
$$K = \frac{\det \mathrm{I\!I}_p}{\det \mathrm{I}_p} = \frac{ LN-M^2}{EG-F^2 },$$
where L, M, and N are the coefficients of the second fundamental form.

Theorema egregium of Gauss states that the Gaussian curvature of a surface can be expressed solely in terms of the first fundamental form and its derivatives, so that K is in fact an intrinsic invariant of the surface. An explicit expression for the Gaussian curvature in terms of the first fundamental form is provided by the Brioschi formula.

== See also ==
- Metric tensor
- Second fundamental form
- Third fundamental form
- Tautological one-form
- Gram matrix
