= Second fundamental form =

Quadratic form related to curvatures of surfaces

In differential geometry, the second fundamental form (or shape tensor) is a quadratic form on the tangent plane of a smooth surface in the three-dimensional Euclidean space, usually denoted by $\mathrm{I\!I}$ (read "two"). Together with the first fundamental form, it serves to define extrinsic invariants of the surface, its principal curvatures. More generally, such a quadratic form is defined for a smooth immersed submanifold in a Riemannian manifold.

== Surface in R^{3} ==
Definition of second fundamental form

=== Motivation ===
The second fundamental form of a parametric surface S in R^{3} was introduced and studied by Gauss. First suppose that the surface is the graph of a twice continuously differentiable function, z = f(x,y), and that the plane z = 0 is tangent to the surface at the origin. Then f and its partial derivatives with respect to x and y vanish at (0,0). Therefore, the Taylor expansion of f at (0,0) starts with quadratic terms:

$$z=L\frac{x^2}{2} + Mxy + N\frac{y^2}{2} + \text{higher order terms}\,,$$

and the second fundamental form at the origin in the coordinates (x,y) is the quadratic form

$$L \, dx^2 + 2M \, dx \, dy + N \, dy^2 \,.$$

For a smooth point P on S, one can choose the coordinate system so that the plane z = 0 is tangent to S at P, and define the second fundamental form in the same way.

=== Classical notation ===
The second fundamental form of a general parametric surface is defined as follows. Let r = r(u,v) be a regular parametrization of a surface in R^{3}, where r is a smooth vector-valued function of two variables. It is common to denote the partial derivatives of r with respect to u and v by r_{u} and r_{v}. Regularity of the parametrization means that r_{u} and r_{v} are linearly independent for any (u,v) in the domain of r, and hence span the tangent plane to S at each point. Equivalently, the cross product r_{u} × r_{v} is a nonzero vector normal to the surface. The parametrization thus defines a field of unit normal vectors n:

$$\mathbf{n} = \frac{\mathbf{r}_u\times\mathbf{r}_v}{|\mathbf{r}_u\times\mathbf{r}_v|} \,.$$

The second fundamental form is usually written as

$$\mathrm{I\!I} = L\, du^2 + 2M\, du\, dv + N\, dv^2 \,;$$

its matrix in the basis {r_{u}, r_{v}} of the tangent plane is

$$\begin{bmatrix}
L&M\\
M&N
\end{bmatrix} \,.$$

The coefficients L, M, N at a given point in the parametric uv-plane are given by the projections of the second partial derivatives of r at that point onto the normal line to S and can be computed with the aid of the dot product as follows:

$$L = \mathbf{r}_{uu} \cdot \mathbf{n}\,, \quad
M = \mathbf{r}_{uv} \cdot \mathbf{n}\,, \quad
N = \mathbf{r}_{vv} \cdot \mathbf{n}\,.$$

For a signed distance field of Hessian H, the second fundamental form coefficients can be computed as follows:

$$L = -\mathbf{r}_u \cdot \mathbf{H} \cdot \mathbf{r}_u\,, \quad
M = -\mathbf{r}_u \cdot \mathbf{H} \cdot \mathbf{r}_v\,, \quad
N = -\mathbf{r}_v \cdot \mathbf{H} \cdot \mathbf{r}_v\,.$$

=== Physicist's notation ===
The second fundamental form of a general parametric surface S is defined as follows.

Let r = r(u^{1},u^{2}) be a regular parametrization of a surface in R^{3}, where r is a smooth vector-valued function of two variables. It is common to denote the partial derivatives of r with respect to u^{α} by r_{α}, α = 1, 2. Regularity of the parametrization means that r_{1} and r_{2} are linearly independent for any (u^{1},u^{2}) in the domain of r, and hence span the tangent plane to S at each point. Equivalently, the cross product r_{1} × r_{2} is a nonzero vector normal to the surface. The parametrization thus defines a field of unit normal vectors n:

$$\mathbf{n} = \frac{\mathbf{r}_1\times\mathbf{r}_2}{|\mathbf{r}_1\times\mathbf{r}_2|}\,.$$

The second fundamental form is usually written as

$$\mathrm{I\!I} = b_{\alpha \beta} \, du^{\alpha} \, du^{\beta} \,.$$

The equation above uses the Einstein summation convention.

The coefficients b_{αβ} at a given point in the parametric u^{1}u^{2}-plane are given by the projections of the second partial derivatives of r at that point onto the normal line to S and can be computed in terms of the normal vector n as follows:

$$b_{\alpha \beta} = r_{,\alpha \beta}^{\ \ \,\gamma} n_{\gamma}\,.$$

== Hypersurface in a Riemannian manifold ==
In Euclidean space, the second fundamental form is given by

$$\mathrm{I\!I}(v,w) = -\langle d\nu(v),w\rangle$$

where $\nu$ is the Gauss map, and $d\nu$ the differential of $\nu$ regarded as a vector-valued differential form, and the brackets denote the metric tensor of Euclidean space.

More generally, on a Riemannian manifold, the second fundamental form is an equivalent way to describe the shape operator (denoted by S) of a hypersurface,

$$\mathrm I\!\mathrm I(v,w)=\langle S(v),w\rangle = -\langle \nabla_v n,w\rangle=\langle n,\nabla_v w\rangle \,,$$

where ∇_{v}w denotes the covariant derivative of the ambient manifold and n a field of normal vectors on the hypersurface. (If the affine connection is torsion-free, then the second fundamental form is symmetric.)

The sign of the second fundamental form depends on the choice of direction of n (which is called a co-orientation of the hypersurface - for surfaces in Euclidean space, this is equivalently given by a choice of orientation of the surface).

=== Generalization to arbitrary codimension ===
The second fundamental form can be generalized to arbitrary codimension. In that case it is a quadratic form on the tangent space with values in the normal bundle and it can be defined by

$$\mathrm{I\!I}(v,w)=(\nabla_v w)^\bot\,,$$

where $(\nabla_v w)^\bot$ denotes the orthogonal projection of covariant derivative $\nabla_v w$ onto the normal bundle.

In Euclidean space, the curvature tensor of a submanifold can be described by the following formula:

$$\langle R(u,v)w,z\rangle =\mathrm I\!\mathrm I(u,z)\mathrm I\!\mathrm I(v,w)-\mathrm I\!\mathrm I(u,w)\mathrm I\!\mathrm I(v,z).$$

This is called the Gauss equation, as it may be viewed as a generalization of Gauss's Theorema Egregium.

For general Riemannian manifolds one has to add the curvature of ambient space; if N is a manifold embedded in a Riemannian manifold (M,g) then the curvature tensor R_{N} of N with induced metric can be expressed using the second fundamental form and R_{M}, the curvature tensor of M:

$$\langle R_N(u,v)w,z\rangle = \langle R_M(u,v)w,z\rangle+\langle \mathrm I\!\mathrm I(u,z),\mathrm I\!\mathrm I(v,w)\rangle-\langle \mathrm I\!\mathrm I(u,w),\mathrm I\!\mathrm I(v,z)\rangle\,.$$

== Example ==
- The second fundamental form of a plane is identically zero. A plane has a constant unit normal vector $\mathbf{n}$, so the second derivatives $\mathbf{r}_{uu}, \mathbf{r}_{uv}, \mathbf{r}_{vv}$ are tangent to the surface. Consequently, all coefficients $L, M, N$ in the second fundamental form are zero, and $\mathrm{I\!I} = 0$.
- The second fundamental form of the unit sphere $x^2 + y^2 + z^2 = 1$ in the local coordinates $\mathbf{r}(u,v) = (\sin u \cos v, \sin u \sin v, \cos u)$ is $\mathrm{I\!I} = -du^2 - \sin^2 u dv^2$. The outward unit normal vector $\mathbf{n}$ coincides with $\mathbf{r}(u,v)$. Computing dot products of $\mathbf{n}$ with $\mathbf{r}_{uu}, \mathbf{r}_{uv}, \mathbf{r}_{vv}$ yields $L=-1,\, M=0,\, N=-\sin^2 u$.

== See also ==
- First fundamental form
- Gaussian curvature
- Gauss–Codazzi equations
- Shape operator
- Third fundamental form
- Tautological one-form
