= Lemma (mathematics) =

Theorem for proving more complex theorems

In mathematics and other fields, (Note: Such as informal logic, argument mapping, and philosophy.) a lemma (pl.: lemmas or lemmata) is a generally minor proven proposition used to prove a larger statement. For that reason, it is also known as a "helping theorem" or an "auxiliary theorem". In many cases, a lemma derives its importance from the theorem it aims to prove; however, a lemma can also turn out to be more important than originally thought.

== Etymology ==
From the Ancient Greek λῆμμα, (perfect passive εἴλημμαι) something received or taken. Thus, something taken for granted in an argument.

== Comparison with theorem ==
There is no formal distinction between a lemma and a theorem, only one of intention (see Theorem § Terminology). A result is called a lemma when it is a minor result whose purpose is to help prove a more substantial theorem, and the author does not expect it to be useful in other contexts. Often, a theorem is broken into multiple cases (for example, a quadratic function may have no real roots, one double root, or two distinct roots), and each case proved as a lemma; such lemmas are more limited cases of the overall theorem and so not worth remembering individually. However, some lemmas turn out to be more useful than originally foreseen, and so become well-known in their own right.

== Well-known lemmas ==
Some powerful results in mathematics are known as lemmas, first named for their originally minor purpose. These include, among others:

- Bézout's lemma
- Burnside's lemma
- Dehn's lemma
- Euclid's lemma
- Farkas' lemma
- Fatou's lemma
- Gauss's lemma (any of several named after Carl Friedrich Gauss)
- Greendlinger's lemma
- Itô's lemma
- Jordan's lemma
- Lovász local lemma
- Nakayama's lemma
- Noether normalization lemma
- Poincaré's lemma
- Riesz's lemma
- Schur's lemma
- Schwarz's lemma
- Sperner's lemma
- Urysohn's lemma
- Vitali covering lemma
- Yoneda's lemma
- Zariski's lemma
- Zorn's lemma

While these results originally seemed too simple or too technical to warrant independent interest, they have eventually turned out to be central to the theories in which they occur.

== See also ==
- Axiom
- Corollary
- Co-premise
- Fundamental lemma
- Inference objection
- Objection
- Porism
