= Regular surface =

In mathematics, regular surface may refer to:

- Regular surface (differential geometry)
- Non-singular algebraic variety of dimension two
