= Exponential map (Riemannian geometry) =

Map from tangent space to the manifold

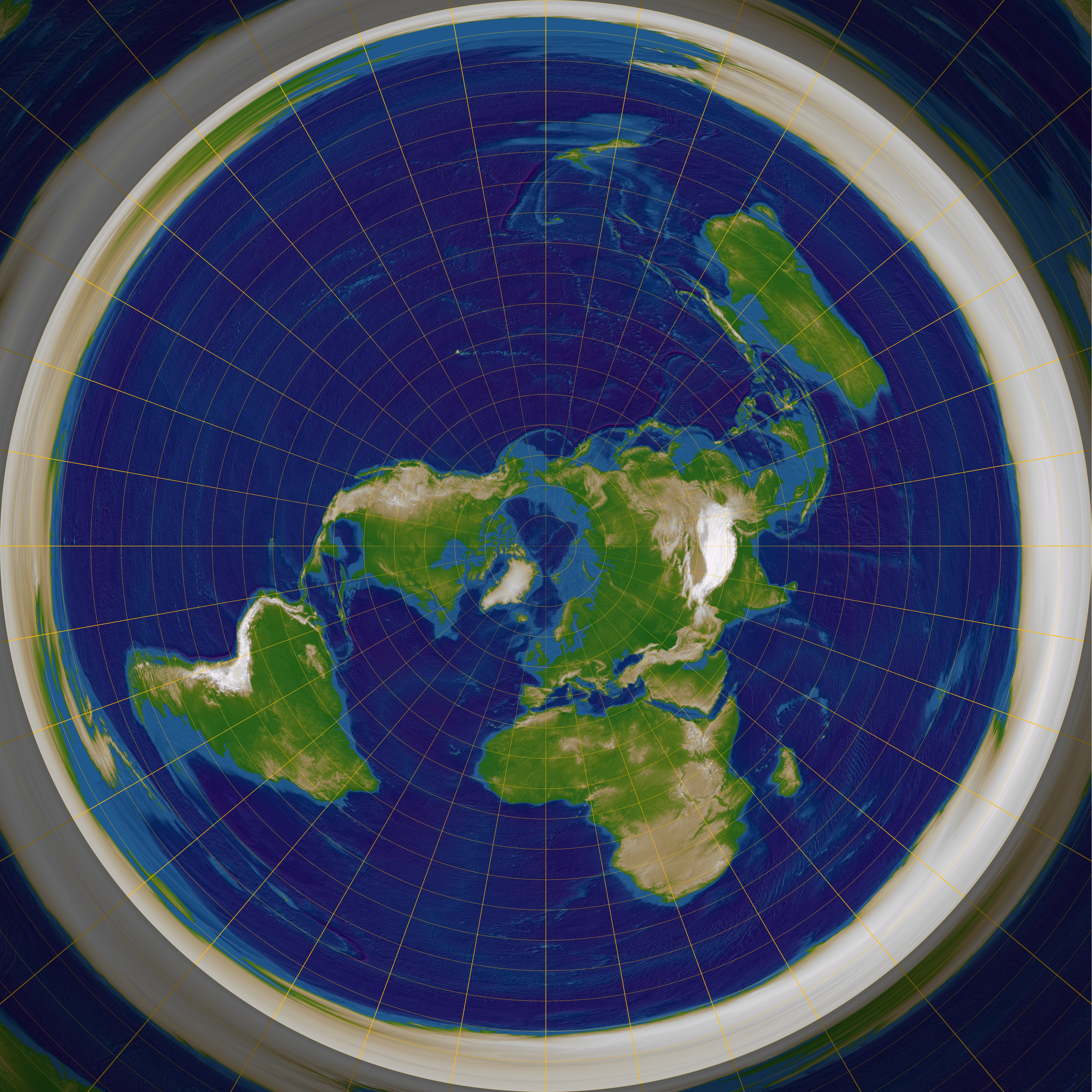
The exponential map of the Earth as viewed from the north pole is the polar azimuthal equidistant projection in cartography.

In Riemannian geometry, an exponential map is a map from a subset of a tangent space $T_pM$ of a Riemannian manifold (or pseudo-Riemannian manifold) $M$ to $M$ itself. The (pseudo) Riemannian metric determines a canonical affine connection, and the exponential map of the (pseudo) Riemannian manifold is given by the exponential map of this connection.

== Definition ==
Let $M$ be a differentiable manifold and $p$ a point of $M$. An affine connection on $M$ allows one to define the notion of a straight line through the point $p$.

Let $v\in T_pM$ be a tangent vector to the manifold at $p$. Then there is a unique geodesic $\gamma_v:[0,1]\rightarrow M$ satisfying $\gamma_v(0)=p$ with initial tangent vector $\gamma_v'(0)=v$. The corresponding exponential map is defined by $\exp_p(v)=\gamma_v(1)$. In general, the exponential map is only locally defined, that is, it only takes a small neighborhood of the origin at $T_pM$, to a neighborhood of $p$ in the manifold. This is because it relies on the theorem of existence and uniqueness for ordinary differential equations which is local in nature. An affine connection is called complete if the exponential map is well-defined at every point of the tangent bundle.

== Properties ==
Intuitively speaking, the exponential map takes a given tangent vector to the manifold, runs along the geodesic starting at that point and goes in that direction, for one unit of time. Since $v$ corresponds to the velocity vector of the geodesic, the actual (Riemannian) distance traveled will be dependent on that. We can also reparametrize geodesics to be unit speed, so equivalently we can define $\exp_p(v)=\beta(|v|)$ where $\beta$ is the unit-speed geodesic (geodesic parameterized by arc length) going in the direction of $v$. As we vary the tangent vector $v$ we will get, when applying $\exp_p$, different points on $M$ which are within some distance from the base point $p$—this is perhaps one of the most concrete ways of demonstrating that the tangent space to a manifold is a kind of "linearization" of the manifold.

The Hopf–Rinow theorem asserts that it is possible to define the exponential map on the whole tangent space if and only if the manifold is complete as a metric space (which justifies the usual term geodesically complete for a manifold having an exponential map with this property). In particular, compact manifolds are geodesically complete. However even if $\exp_p$ is defined on the whole tangent space, it will in general not be a global diffeomorphism. However, its differential at the origin of the tangent space is the identity map and so, by the inverse function theorem we can find a neighborhood of the origin of $T_pM$ on which the exponential map is an embedding (i.e., the exponential map is a local diffeomorphism). The radius of the largest ball about the origin in $T_pM$ that can be mapped diffeomorphically via $\exp_p$ is called the injectivity radius of $M$ at $p$. The cut locus of the exponential map is, roughly speaking, the set of all points where the exponential map fails to have a unique minimum.

An important property of the exponential map is the following lemma of Gauss (yet another Gauss's lemma): given any tangent vector $v$ in the domain of definition of $\exp_p$, and another vector $w$ based at the tip of $v$ (hence $w$ is actually in the double-tangent space $T_v(T_pM)$) and orthogonal to $v$, $w$ remains orthogonal to $v$ when pushed forward via the exponential map. This means, in particular, that the boundary sphere of a small ball about the origin in $T_pM$ is orthogonal to the geodesics in $M$ determined by those vectors (i.e., the geodesics are radial). This motivates the definition of geodesic normal coordinates on a Riemannian manifold.

The exponential map is also useful in relating the abstract definition of curvature to the more concrete realization of it originally conceived by Riemann himself—the sectional curvature is intuitively defined as the Gaussian curvature of some surface (i.e., a slicing of the manifold by a 2-dimensional submanifold) through the point $p$ in consideration. Via the exponential map, it now can be precisely defined as the Gaussian curvature of a surface through $p$ determined by the image under $\exp_p$ of a 2-dimensional subspace of $T_pM$.

== Relationships to exponential maps in Lie theory ==
In the case of Lie groups with a bi-invariant metric—a pseudo-Riemannian metric invariant under both left and right translation—the exponential maps of the pseudo-Riemannian structure are the same as the exponential maps of the Lie group. In general, Lie groups do not have a bi-invariant metric, though all connected semi-simple (or reductive) Lie groups do. The existence of a bi-invariant Riemannian metric is stronger than that of a pseudo-Riemannian metric, and implies that the Lie algebra is the Lie algebra of a compact Lie group; conversely, any compact (or abelian) Lie group has such a Riemannian metric.

Take the example that gives the "honest" exponential map. Consider the positive real numbers $\mathbb{R}^+$, a Lie group under the usual multiplication. Then each tangent space is just $\mathbb{R}$. On each copy of $\mathbb{R}$ at the point $y$, we introduce the modified inner product
$$\langle u,v\rangle_y = \frac{uv}{y^2}$$
multiplying them as usual real numbers but scaling by $y^2$ (this is what makes the metric left-invariant, for left multiplication by a factor will just pull out of the inner product, twice — canceling the square in the denominator).

Consider the point $1\in\mathbb{R}^+$, and $x\in\mathbb{R}$ an element of the tangent space at 1. The usual straight line emanating from 1, namely $y(t)=1+xt$ covers the same path as a geodesic, of course, except we have to reparametrize so as to get a curve with constant speed ("constant speed", remember, is not going to be the ordinary constant speed, because we're using this funny metric). To do this we reparametrize by arc length (the integral of the length of the tangent vector in the norm $|\cdot|_y$ induced by the modified metric):
$$s(t) = \int_0^t |x|_{y(\tau)} d\tau = \int_0^t \frac{|x|}{1 + \tau x} d\tau = |x| \int_0^t \frac{d\tau}{1 + \tau x} = \frac{|x|}{x} \ln|1 + tx|$$

and after inverting the function to obtain $t$ as a function of $s$, we substitute and get
$$y(s) = e^{sx/|x|}$$

Now using the unit speed definition, we have
$$\exp_1(x) = y(|x|_1) = y(|x|),$$
giving the expected $e^x$.

The Riemannian distance defined by this is simply
$$\operatorname{dist}(a, b) = \left|\ln\left(\frac b a\right)\right|.$$

== See also ==
- List of exponential topics
