= Monge patch =

Concept in differential geometry

In the differential geometry of surfaces, the Monge patch designates the parameterization of a surface by its height over a flat reference plane. It is also called Monge parameterization or Monge form.

In physical theory of surface and interface roughness, and especially in the study of shape conformations of membranes, it is usually called the Monge gauge, or less frequently the Monge representation.

== Details ==
If the reference plane is the Cartesian xy plane, then in the Monge gauge the surface under study is fully characterized by its height z=u(x,y). Typically, the reference plane represents the average surface so that the first moment of the height is zero, <u>=0.

The Monge gauge has two obvious limitations: If the average surface is not plane, then the Monge gauge only makes sense on length scales smaller than the curvature of the average surface. And the Monge gauge fails completely if the surface is so strongly bent that there are overhangs (points x,y corresponding to more than one z).

== Origin of the term ==
The term refers to Gaspard Monge and his work in differential geometry. "Monge form" was found in a textbook from 1947, "Monge patch" in one from 1966. The first use of "Monge gauge" seems to be in a 1989 physics paper by Golubović and Lubensky.
