= Synge's world function =

Locally defined function in general relativity

In general relativity, Synge's world function is a smooth locally defined function of pairs of points in a smooth spacetime $M$ with smooth Lorentzian metric $g$. Let $x, x'$ be two points in spacetime, and suppose $x$ belongs to a convex normal neighborhood $U$ of $x, x'$ (referred to the Levi-Civita connection associated to $g$) so that there exists a unique geodesic $\gamma(\lambda)$ from $x$ to $x'$ included in $U$, up to the affine parameter $\lambda$. Suppose $\gamma(\lambda_0) = x'$ and $\gamma(\lambda_1) = x$. Then Synge's world function is defined as:

$$\sigma(x,x') = \frac{1}{2} (\lambda_{1}-\lambda_{0}) \int_{\gamma} g_{\mu\nu}(z) t^{\mu}t^{\nu} d\lambda$$

where $t^{\mu}= \frac{dz^{\mu}}{d\lambda}$ is the tangent vector to the affinely parametrized geodesic $\gamma(\lambda)$. That is, $\sigma(x,x')$ is half the square of the signed geodesic length from $x$ to $x'$ computed along the unique geodesic segment, in $U$, joining the two points. Synge's world function is well-defined, since the integral above is invariant under reparameterization. In particular, for Minkowski spacetime, the Synge's world function simplifies to half the spacetime interval between the two points: it is globally defined and it takes the form

$$\sigma(x,x') = \frac{1}{2} \eta_{\alpha \beta} (x-x')^{\alpha} (x-x')^{\beta}.$$

Obviously Synge's function can be defined also in Riemannian manifolds and in that case it has non-negative sign. Generally speaking, Synge’s function is only locally defined and an attempt to define an extension to domains larger than convex normal neighborhoods generally leads to a multivalued function since there may be several geodesic segments joining a pair of points in the spacetime. It is however possible to define it in a neighborhood of the diagonal of $M\times M$, though this definition requires some arbitrary choice. Synge's world function (also its extension to a neighborhood of the diagonal of $M\times M$ ) appears in particular in a number of theoretical constructions of quantum field theory in curved spacetime. It is the crucial object used to construct a parametrix of Green’s functions of Lorentzian Green hyperbolic 2nd order partial differential equations in a globally hyperbolic manifold, and in the definition of Hadamard Gaussian states.
