= Gauss's lemma =

Gauss's lemma can mean any of several mathematical lemmas named after Carl Friedrich Gauss:

- Gauss's lemma (polynomials), the greatest common divisor of the coefficients is a multiplicative function
- Gauss's lemma (number theory), condition under which an integer is a quadratic residue
- Gauss's lemma (Riemannian geometry), theorem in manifold theory
- A generalization of Euclid's lemma is sometimes called Gauss's lemma

== See also ==
- List of topics named after Carl Friedrich Gauss
