= Normal coordinates =

Special coordinate system in differential geometry

In differential geometry, normal coordinates at a point p in a differentiable manifold equipped with a symmetric affine connection are a local coordinate system in a neighborhood of p obtained by applying the exponential map to the tangent space at p. In a normal coordinate system, the Christoffel symbols of the connection vanish at the point p, thus often simplifying local calculations. In normal coordinates associated to the Levi-Civita connection of a Riemannian manifold, one can additionally arrange that the metric tensor is the Kronecker delta at the point p, and that the first partial derivatives of the metric at p vanish.

A basic result of differential geometry states that normal coordinates at a point always exist on a manifold with a symmetric affine connection. In such coordinates the covariant derivative reduces to a partial derivative (at p only), and the geodesics through p are locally linear functions of t (the affine parameter). This idea was implemented in a fundamental way by Albert Einstein in the general theory of relativity: the equivalence principle uses normal coordinates via inertial frames. Normal coordinates always exist for the Levi-Civita connection of a Riemannian or Pseudo-Riemannian manifold. By contrast, in general there is no way to define normal coordinates for Finsler manifolds in a way that the exponential map are twice-differentiable (Busemann 1955).

== Geodesic normal coordinates ==
Geodesic normal coordinates are local coordinates on a manifold with an affine connection defined by means of the exponential map

$$\exp_p : T_{p}M \supset V \rightarrow M$$

with $V$ an open neighborhood of 0 in $T_{p}M$, and an isomorphism

$$E: \mathbb{R}^n \rightarrow T_{p}M$$

given by any basis of the tangent space at the fixed basepoint $p\in M$. If the additional structure of a Riemannian metric is imposed, then the basis defined by E may be required in addition to be orthonormal, and the resulting coordinate system is then known as a Riemannian normal coordinate system.

Normal coordinates exist on a normal neighborhood of a point p in M. A normal neighborhood U is an open subset of M such that there is a proper neighborhood V of the origin in the tangent space T_{p}M, and exp_{p} acts as a diffeomorphism between U and V. On a normal neighborhood U of p in M, the chart is given by:

$$\varphi := E^{-1} \circ \exp_p^{-1}: U \rightarrow \mathbb{R}^n$$

The isomorphism E, and therefore the chart, is in no way unique. A convex normal neighborhood U is a normal neighborhood of every p in U. The existence of these sorts of open neighborhoods (they form a topological basis) has been established by J.H.C. Whitehead for symmetric affine connections.

=== Properties ===
The properties of normal coordinates often simplify computations. In the following, assume that $U$ is a normal neighborhood centered at a point $p$ in $M$ and $x^i$ are normal coordinates on $U$.

- Let $V$ be some vector from $T_p M$ with components $V^i$ in local coordinates, and $\gamma_V$ be the geodesic with $\gamma_V(0) = p$ and $\gamma_V'(0) = V$. Then in normal coordinates, $\gamma_V(t) = (tV^1,\ldots,tV^n)$ as long as it is in $U$. Thus radial paths in normal coordinates are exactly the geodesics through $p$.
- The coordinates of the point $p$ are $(0,\ldots,0)$.
- In Riemannian normal coordinates at a point $p$ the components of the Riemannian metric $g_{ij}$ simplify to $\delta_{ij}$, i.e., $g_{ij}(p)=\delta_{ij}$.
- The Christoffel symbols vanish at $p$, i.e., $\Gamma_{ij}^k(p)=0$. In the Riemannian case, so do the first partial derivatives of $g_{ij}$, i.e., $\frac{\partial g_{ij}}{\partial x^k}(p) = 0,\,\forall i,j,k$.

=== Explicit formulae ===
In the neighbourhood of any point $p=(0,\ldots 0)$ equipped with a locally orthonormal coordinate system in which $g_{\mu\nu}(0)= \delta_{\mu\nu}$ and the Riemann tensor at $p$ takes the value $R_{\mu\sigma \nu\tau}(0)$ we can adjust the coordinates $x^\mu$ so that the components of the metric tensor away from $p$ become

$$g_{\mu\nu}(x)= \delta_{\mu\nu} - \tfrac{1}{3} R_{\mu\sigma \nu\tau}(0) x^\sigma x^\tau + O(|x|^3).$$

The corresponding Levi-Civita connection Christoffel symbols are

$${\Gamma^{\lambda}}_{\mu\nu}(x) = -\tfrac{1}{3} \bigl[ {R^{\lambda}}_{\nu\mu\tau}(0)+{R^{\lambda}}_{\mu\nu\tau}(0) \bigr] x^\tau+ O(|x|^2).$$

Similarly we can construct local coframes ${\bold e}^{*a}= e_\mu^{*a}dx^\mu$in which

$$e^{*a}_\mu(x)= \delta_{a \mu} - \tfrac{1}{6} R_{a \sigma \mu\tau}(0) x^\sigma x^\tau +O(x^2),$$

and the spin-connection coefficients take the values

$${\omega^a}_{b\mu}(x)= - \tfrac{1}{2} {R^a}_{b\mu\tau}(0)x^\tau+O(|x|^2).$$

== Polar coordinates ==
On a Riemannian manifold, a normal coordinate system at p facilitates the introduction of a system of spherical coordinates, known as polar coordinates. These are the coordinates on M obtained by introducing the standard spherical coordinate system on the Euclidean space T_{p}M. That is, one introduces on T_{p}M the standard spherical coordinate system (r,φ) where r ≥ 0 is the radial parameter and φ = (φ_{1},...,φ_{n−1}) is a parameterization of the (n−1)-sphere. Composition of (r,φ) with the inverse of the exponential map at p is a polar coordinate system.

Polar coordinates provide a number of fundamental tools in Riemannian geometry. The radial coordinate is the most significant: geometrically it represents the geodesic distance to p of nearby points. Gauss's lemma asserts that the gradient of r is simply the partial derivative $\partial/\partial r$. That is,

$$\langle df, dr\rangle = \frac{\partial f}{\partial r}$$

for any smooth function $f$. As a result, the metric in polar coordinates assumes a block diagonal form

$$g = \begin{bmatrix}
1&0&\cdots\ 0\\
0&&\\
\vdots &&g_{\phi\phi}(r,\phi)\\
0&&
\end{bmatrix}.$$

== See also ==
- Gauss Lemma
- Fermi coordinates
- Local reference frame
- Synge's world function
