= Gauss's lemma (Riemannian geometry) =

Theorem in manifold theory

In Riemannian geometry, Gauss's lemma asserts that any sufficiently small sphere centered at a point in a Riemannian manifold is perpendicular to every geodesic through the point. More formally, let M be a Riemannian manifold, equipped with its Levi-Civita connection, and p a point of M. The exponential map is a mapping from the tangent space at p to M:

$$\mathrm{exp} : T_pM \to M$$

which is a diffeomorphism in a neighborhood of zero. Gauss' lemma asserts that the image of a sphere of sufficiently small radius in T_{p}M under the exponential map is perpendicular to all geodesics originating at p. The lemma allows the exponential map to be understood as a radial isometry, and is of fundamental importance in the study of geodesic convexity and normal coordinates.

== Introduction ==
We define the exponential map at $p\in M$ by

$$\exp_p: T_pM\supset B_{\epsilon}(0) \longrightarrow M,\quad vt \longmapsto \gamma_{p,v}(t),$$

where $\gamma_{p,v}$ is the unique geodesic with $\gamma_{p,v}(0)=p$ and tangent $\gamma_{p,v}'(0)=v \in T_pM$ and $\epsilon$ is chosen small enough so that for every $t \in [0, 1], vt \in B_{\epsilon}(0) \subset T_pM$ the geodesic $\gamma_{p,v}(t)$ is defined. So, if $M$ is complete, then, by the Hopf–Rinow theorem, $\exp_p$ is defined on the whole tangent space.

Let $\alpha : I\rightarrow T_pM$ be a curve differentiable in $T_pM$ such that $\alpha(0):=0$ and $\alpha'(0):=v$. Since $T_pM\cong \mathbb R^n$, it is clear that we can choose $\alpha(t):=vt$. In this case, by the definition of the differential of the exponential in $0$ applied over $v$, we obtain:

$$T_0\exp_p(v) = \frac{\mathrm d}{\mathrm d t}  \Bigl(\exp_p\circ\alpha(t)\Bigr)\Big\vert_{t=0} = \frac{\mathrm d}{\mathrm d t} \Bigl(\exp_p(vt)\Bigr)\Big\vert_{t=0}=\frac{\mathrm d}{\mathrm d t} \Bigl(\gamma_{p, v}(t)\Bigr)\Big\vert_{t=0}= \gamma_{p, v}'(0)=v.$$

So (with the right identification $T_0 T_p M \cong T_pM$) the differential of $\exp_p$ is the identity. By the implicit function theorem, $\exp_p$ is a diffeomorphism on a neighborhood of $0 \in T_pM$. The Gauss Lemma now tells that $\exp_p$ is also a radial isometry.

== The exponential map is a radial isometry ==
Let $p\in M$. In what follows, we make the identification $T_vT_pM\cong T_pM\cong \mathbb R^n$.

Gauss's Lemma states: Let $v,w\in B_\epsilon(0)\subset T_vT_pM\cong T_pM$ and $M\ni q:=\exp_p(v)$. Then, $\langle T_v\exp_p(v), T_v\exp_p(w)\rangle_q = \langle v,w\rangle_p.$

For $p\in M$, this lemma means that $\exp_p$ is a radial isometry in the following sense: let $v\in B_\epsilon(0)$, i.e. such that $\exp_p$ is well defined. And let $q:=\exp_p(v)\in M$. Then the exponential $\exp_p$ remains an isometry in $q$, and, more generally, all along the geodesic $\gamma$ (in so far as $\gamma_{p, v}(1)=\exp_p(v)$ is well defined)! Then, radially, in all the directions permitted by the domain of definition of $\exp_p$, it remains an isometry.

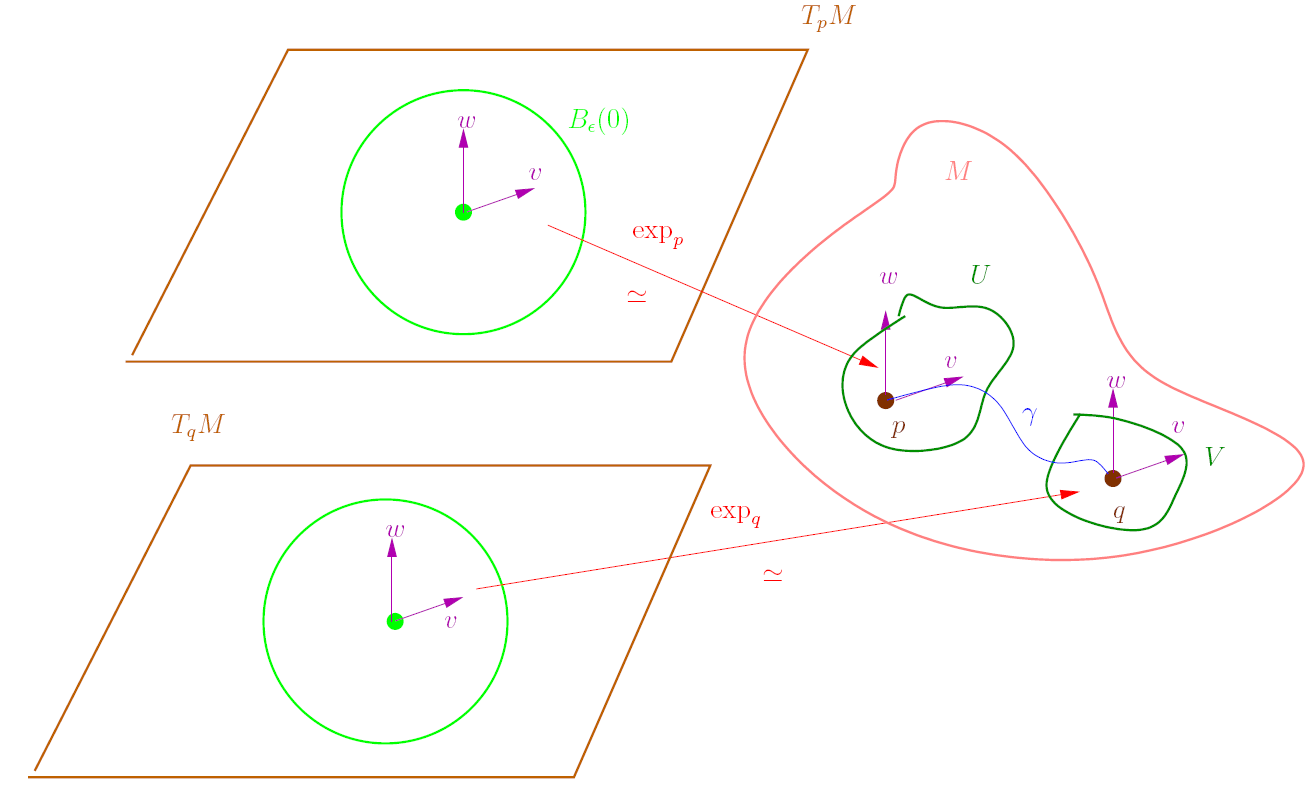
The exponential map as a radial isometry

== Proof ==
Recall that

$$T_v\exp_p \colon T_pM\cong T_vT_pM\supset T_vB_\epsilon(0)\longrightarrow T_{\exp_p(v)}M.$$

We proceed in three steps:

- $T_v\exp_p(v)=v$ : let us construct a curve

$\alpha : \mathbb R \supset I \rightarrow T_pM$ such that $\alpha(0):=v\in T_pM$ and $\alpha'(0):=v\in T_vT_pM\cong T_pM$. Since $T_vT_pM\cong T_pM\cong \mathbb R^n$, we can put $\alpha(t):=v(t+1)$. Therefore,

$T_v\exp_p(v) = \frac{\mathrm d}{\mathrm d t}\Bigl(\exp_p\circ\alpha(t)\Bigr)\Big\vert_{t=0}=\frac{\mathrm d}{\mathrm d t}\Bigl(\exp_p(tv)\Bigr)\Big\vert_{t=1}=\Gamma(\gamma)_p^{\exp_p(v)}v=v,$

where $\Gamma$ is the parallel transport operator and $\gamma(t)=\exp_p(tv)$. The last equality is true because $\gamma$ is a geodesic, therefore $\gamma'$ is parallel.

Now let us calculate the scalar product $\langle T_v\exp_p(v), T_v\exp_p(w)\rangle$.

We separate $w$ into a component $w_T$ parallel to $v$ and a component $w_N$ normal to $v$. In particular, we put $w_T:=a v$, $a \in \mathbb R$.

The preceding step implies directly:

$$\langle T_v\exp_p(v), T_v\exp_p(w)\rangle = \langle T_v\exp_p(v), T_v\exp_p(w_T)\rangle + \langle T_v\exp_p(v), T_v\exp_p(w_N)\rangle$$

$$=a \langle T_v\exp_p(v), T_v\exp_p(v)\rangle + \langle T_v\exp_p(v), T_v\exp_p(w_N)\rangle=\langle v, w_T\rangle + \langle T_v\exp_p(v), T_v\exp_p(w_N)\rangle.$$

We must therefore show that the second term is null, because, according to Gauss's Lemma, we must have:

$\langle T_v\exp_p(v), T_v\exp_p(w_N)\rangle = \langle v, w_N\rangle = 0.$

- $\langle T_v\exp_p(v), T_v\exp_p(w_N)\rangle = 0$ :

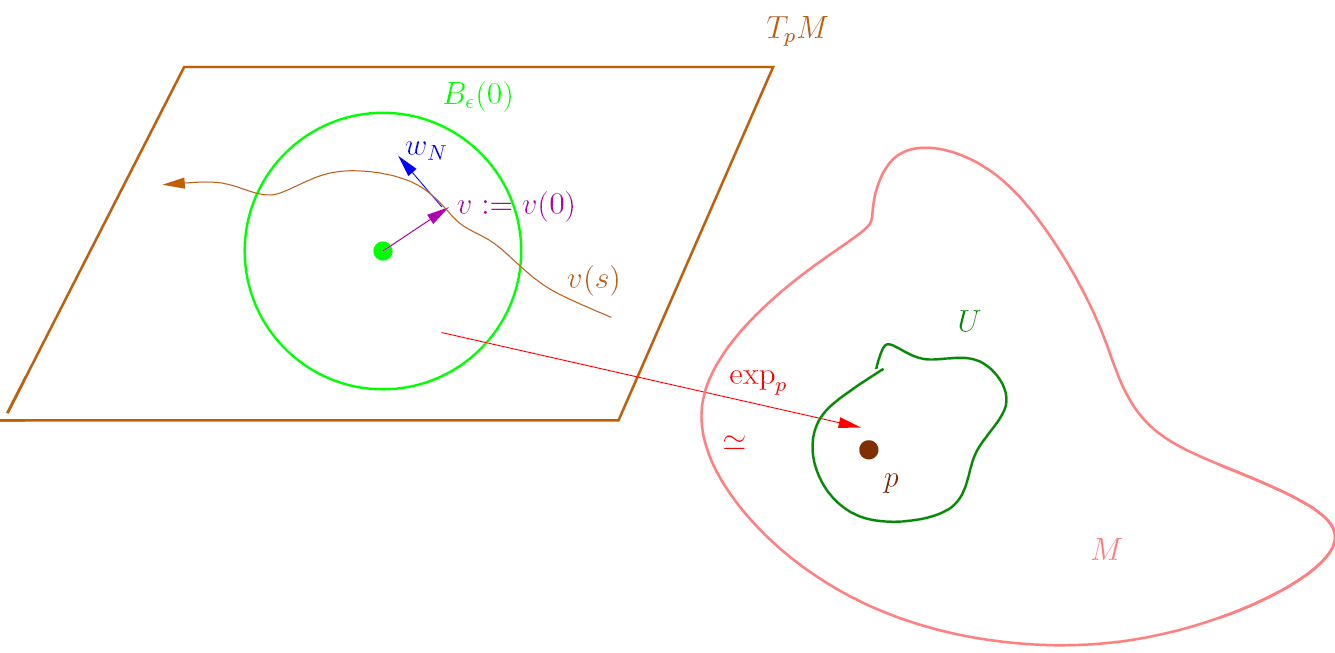
The curve chosen to prove lemma

Let us define the curve

$$\alpha \colon [-\epsilon, \epsilon]\times [0,1] \longrightarrow T_pM,\qquad (s,t) \longmapsto tv+tsw_N.$$

Note that

$$\alpha(0,1)  = v,\qquad
\frac{\partial \alpha}{\partial t}(s,t)  = v+sw_N,
\qquad\frac{\partial \alpha}{\partial s}(0,t) = tw_N.$$

Let us put:

$$f \colon [-\epsilon, \epsilon ]\times [0,1] \longrightarrow M,\qquad (s,t)\longmapsto \exp_p(tv+tsw_N),$$

and we calculate:

$$T_v\exp_p(v)=T_{\alpha(0,1)}\exp_p\left(\frac{\partial \alpha}{\partial t}(0,1)\right)=\frac{\partial}{\partial t}\Bigl(\exp_p\circ\alpha(s,t)\Bigr)\Big\vert_{t=1, s=0}=\frac{\partial f}{\partial t}(0,1)$$

and

$$T_v\exp_p(w_N)=T_{\alpha(0,1)}\exp_p\left(\frac{\partial \alpha}{\partial s}(0,1)\right)=\frac{\partial}{\partial s}\Bigl(\exp_p\circ\alpha(s,t)\Bigr)\Big\vert_{t=1,s=0}=\frac{\partial f}{\partial s}(0,1).$$

Hence

$$\langle T_v\exp_p(v), T_v\exp_p(w_N)\rangle = \left\langle \frac{\partial f}{\partial t},\frac{\partial f}{\partial s}\right\rangle(0,1).$$

We can now verify that this scalar product is actually independent of the variable $t$, and therefore that, for example:

$$\left\langle\frac{\partial f}{\partial t},\frac{\partial f}{\partial s}\right\rangle(0,1) = \left\langle\frac{\partial f}{\partial t},\frac{\partial f}{\partial s}\right\rangle(0,0) = 0,$$

because, according to what has been given above:

$$\lim_{t\rightarrow 0}\frac{\partial f}{\partial s}(0,t) = \lim_{t\rightarrow 0}T_{tv}\exp_p(tw_N) = 0$$

being given that the differential is a linear map. This will therefore prove the lemma.

- We verify that $\frac{\partial}{\partial t}\left\langle \frac{\partial f}{\partial t},\frac{\partial f}{\partial s}\right\rangle=0$: this is a direct calculation. Since the maps $t\mapsto f(s,t)$ are geodesics,

$$\frac{\partial}{\partial t}\left\langle \frac{\partial f}{\partial t},\frac{\partial f}{\partial s}\right\rangle=\left\langle\underbrace{\frac{D}{\partial t}\frac{\partial f}{\partial t}}_{=0}, \frac{\partial f}{\partial s}\right\rangle + \left\langle\frac{\partial f}{\partial t},\frac{D}{\partial t}\frac{\partial f}{\partial s}\right\rangle = \left\langle\frac{\partial f}{\partial t},\frac{D}{\partial s}\frac{\partial f}{\partial t}\right\rangle=\frac12\frac{\partial }{\partial s}\left\langle \frac{\partial f}{\partial t}, \frac{\partial f}{\partial t}\right\rangle.$$

Since the maps $t\mapsto f(s,t)$ are geodesics, the function $t\mapsto\left\langle\frac{\partial f}{\partial t},\frac{\partial f}{\partial t}\right\rangle$ is constant. Thus,

$$\frac{\partial }{\partial s}\left\langle \frac{\partial f}{\partial t}, \frac{\partial f}{\partial t}\right\rangle
=\frac{\partial }{\partial s}\left\langle v+sw_N,v+sw_N\right\rangle
=2\left\langle v,w_N\right\rangle=0.$$

== See also ==
- Riemannian geometry
- Metric tensor
