= Affine maximal surface =

Surface with vanishing affine mean curvature

In affine differential geometry, an affine maximal surface is a locally strongly convex hypersurface in an equiaffine manifold whose affine mean curvature vanishes identically. Equivalently, they are critical points of an affine area functional.

Affine maximal surfaces are often studied under nonlinear elliptic PDE theory via the linearized Monge–Ampère equation, which allows solutions to certain global problems such as the Bernstein problem and Plateau-type problems for affine maximal graphs.

Blaschke, in his 1923 study, named it "affine minimal surface" due to a misconception. In the Euclidean case, many different surfaces can enclose the same amount of volume, but among these, only one has stable surface area under perturbation, and that one has a minimal surface area (it is the sphere). In analogy, it was thought that in the affine case, if a surface encloses ana fixed amount of volume, and has surface area stable under perturbations, then its surface area is a minimum. It turns out that it is the opposite, that is, affine extremal surfaces are maximal, not minimal. This was found by Calabi in 1982, and it led to the terminology changing to "affine maximal" instead of "affine minimal".

== Definition ==
Let $(M,\nabla,h)$ be an equiaffine manifold, that is, a smooth manifold $M$ equipped with a torsion-free affine connection $\nabla$ and a parallel volume form $h$.

Let $F\colon N\to M$ be a locally strongly convex immersed hypersurface, with Blaschke normal field $\xi$, induced Blaschke metric $g$, and shape operator $S$. The affine mean curvature of $N$ is
$$H_{\text{aff}} = \tfrac{1}{n}\operatorname{tr}_g S,$$
where $n=\dim N$. The immersion $F$ (or its image $N$) is called an affine maximal hypersurface if $H_{\text{aff}}\equiv 0$.

Equivalently, an affine maximal hypersurface is a critical point of the affine area functional
$$\mathcal A(F) = \int_N (\det S)^{\frac{1}{n+2}}\,d\mu_g,$$
with respect to compactly supported variations preserving the affine volume enclosed by $F$.

== Examples ==
Improper affine spheres, such as elliptic paraboloids, are affine maximal, since their affine shape operator is parallel and has constant trace zero.

In the graph case, let $u\colon \mathbb R^2\to \mathbb R$ be a smooth, locally uniformly convex function and consider its graph as a hypersurface in $\mathbb A^3$. Chern conjectured that a Euclidean complete affine maximal graph must be an elliptic paraboloid. Trudinger and Wang proved this Bernstein-type result for affine maximal graphs in dimension 2 and established related results in higher dimensions under uniform convexity assumptions.

== Characterizations ==
Affine maximal hypersurfaces can be characterized as stationary points of the affine area under equiaffine variations or, in the graphical setting, as solutions of a 4th order elliptic PDE, which is the Euler–Lagrange equation of the affine area functional. This was known to Blaschke.

=== Monge–Ampère equation ===
Let $\Omega\subset\mathbb R^n$ be a bounded convex domain and let $u\in C^4(\Omega)$ be strictly convex. Write $D^2u=(u_{ij})$ for the Hessian matrix, $U^{ij}$ for its cofactor matrix and
$$w = (\det D^2u)^{-\frac{n+1}{n+2}}.$$
The graph of $u$ is an affine maximal hypersurface if and only if $u$ satisfies the affine maximal surface equation
$$U^{ij} w_{ij} = 0 \quad\text{in } \Omega,$$
which can be written as a coupled system consisting of the standard Monge–Ampère equation for $\det D^2u$ and its linearization. This formulation makes affine maximal hypersurfaces a natural geometric class for the linearized Monge–Ampère operator and allows the use of a priori estimates and boundary value methods developed for Monge–Ampère type equations.

=== With singularities ===
In some contexts, affine maximal surfaces may be too rigid. For these situations, one may consider affine maximal surfaces with admissible singularities, defined as maps which are affine maximal immersions on the regular set, whose affine metric extends continuously, possibly degenerating, across a singular set.

Admissible singularities are studied with local models, obtained by locally expanding the associated 4th order elliptic PDE. Some singularities are removable, others not. It has an analogous affine Bernstein problem, for complete affine maximal maps with finite affine area.
