= Affine differential geometry =

In differential geometry, affine differential geometry is the study of differential invariants of curves, surfaces, and higher-dimensional submanifolds under affine transformations. Its equiaffine form, often called equiaffine differential geometry, studies invariants under affine transformations that preserve a fixed volume form.

Classically, the subject concerns nondegenerate hypersurfaces in affine space. In contrast with Euclidean differential geometry, which uses a metric and a unit normal vector, equiaffine differential geometry uses the affine or Blaschke normal, the induced affine connection, the affine fundamental form, the affine shape operator, and related invariants such as the cubic form.

The name affine differential geometry reflects Klein's Erlangen program, in which geometries are studied through the invariants of transformation groups.

== Affine geometry in the plane ==
This section based on.

The simplest case of affine differential geometry studies differential properties of curves in the affine plane $\mathbb A^2$. That is, it studies properties of a curve in $\R^2$ that are invariant under an affine transformation of $\R^2$. Many properties are only invariant under an area-preserving affine transformation. These properties are equi-affine, not affine. However, equiaffine properties are essentially affine properties with a fixed length scale, which allows us to convert between equiaffine geometry and affine geometry. For example, since the equiaffine arclength of a strictly convex and smooth curve well-defined, the affine arclength-ratio between two strictly convex and smooth curves is also well-defined.

For the rest of the section, we only consider curves that have continuous 4th derivatives.

=== Affine normal ===
The affine midpoint construction for $y = x^2 - 3 x^3$. The midpoints trace out $x = \tfrac 32 y + O(y^{1.5})$.

The affine midpoint construction for $y = x^2 - 100 x^5$. The midpoints trace out $x = 50 y^2 + O(y^{2.5})$.

An affine normal line of a parabola is its axis.The affine normal line through a strictly convex point on a curve is the axis of the osculating parabola. Equivalently, it is constructed by midpoints.

Let $x(t)$ be a curve with a strictly convex point at $t = 0$, then the affine normal at that point is obtained by cutting the curve near $x(0)$ using lines parallel to the tangent line $(x(0), \dot x(0))$. This produces a family of line segments. Their midpoints trace out another curve. The affine normal line is the tangent line of the midpoint locus at $x(0)$.

The affine focal set of $r = 1 + \epsilon\cos (3\theta)$. It converges to a deltoid curve as $\epsilon \downarrow 0$.

The affine focal set of the elliptic curve $y^2 = x^3 + x^2$.

In detail, if we have a curve specified by
$$x_1(t) = t, \; x_2(t) = \frac 12 x_2''(0)t^2 + \frac 16 x_2^{(3)}(0)t^3 + \cdots$$
then the slope of the midpoint curve at $(0, 0)$ is determined by $x_2^{(3)}(0)$, and its curving is determined by higher-order coefficients, etc. By an affine transformation of the parabola, the axis of the parabola can be matched to the curve.

The envelope curve of the affine normals is the affine focal set. The affine focal set of a parabola is the point at infinity of its axis. Similarly, for both the ellipse and the hyperbola, the affine focal set degenerates to a single point. In general, the affine focal set is a single point iff the curve is a conic section.

Note that in affine geometry, the focus of a conic section is not a meaningful concept, since it is not invariant under equiaffine transformation. Therefore, when the word "focus" is used, it refers to the affine focal set.

==== In general ====
Similarly, for a smooth surface in 3-space, consider its Dupin indicatrix at a point as we shift its tangent plane. If the point is an elliptic point, then the tangent plane cuts a series of ellipses, and the affine normal line is spanned by the centers of the ellipses. Similarly if it is a hyperbolic point. This generalizes to a hypersurface in n-space.

=== Line elements ===
We define a line element to be a line with a distinguished point. It can be represented by $(x, v)$, where $x, v \in \mathbb R^2$, and $v$ is only defined up to a multiplication by a nonzero real number. Now we show that the line elements in the 2-dimensional plane $\R^2$ can be regarded as points in a 3-dimensional space $\mathbb P$.

For any two parabolas in the $\R^2$, there exists an equiaffine transformation mapping one to the other. Thus, many constructions using tangent lines in Euclidean differential geometry can be translated to constructions in affine differential geometry using osculating parabolas instead.

Through any 4 lines in general position, there exists a unique parabola tangent to all 4 of them. Thus, for any 2 line elements $(x, v), (x', v')$, there exists a unique parabola tangent to both of at the points $x, x'$. The 1-parameter family of all line elements tangent to it is a straight line in $\mathbb P$.

Given a parameterized curve $x(t)$, at any point $t_0$, there is a Euclidean transformation that changes the curve to the form of $t \mapsto (t, \tfrac 12 k t^2 O(t^3))$. In other words, the curve has a standard form of $x(t_0 + t) =e_0 t + \tfrac 12 \ddot x(0) t^2 + \cdots$ with $e_0$ of length 1. The vector $e_0$ is unique up to a sign.

This is because at $x(t_0)$, there exists a unique straight line that osculates $x(t)$ with degree 2, thus eliminating 2 terms in the power expansion of $x(t)$.

Similarly, we can find a parabola that is tangent to $x(t)$ at two infinitesimally close points, which means it is an osculation of degree 4, thus eliminating 4 terms in the power expansion of $x(t)$. Therefore, there is an equiaffine transformation that changes the curve to the form of $t \mapsto (t, \tfrac 12 t^2 + O(t^4))$. In other words, there exists two vectors $e_0, e_1$ such that $x(t_0 + t) = x(t_0) + e_0 t + \tfrac 12 e_1 t^2 + \tfrac{1}{24} x^{(4)}(t_0) t^4 + \cdots$, and $e_0, e_1$ span a parallelogram of area 1. The pair $e_0, e_1$ is unique up to a sign of $e_0$.

We will subsequently call this the equiaffine parameterization.

=== Equiaffine arclength ===
The equiaffine arclength is computed by integrating $2(dA)^{1/3}$, where $dA$ are the areas of the infinitesimal triangles depicted.

Since areas are invariant under equiaffine geometry, given 2 line elements $(x, v), (x', v')$ not parallel to each other, they form a triangle. We define the distance $d((x, v), (x', v'))$ between them to be $2A^{1/3}$ of the area of the triangle. In the degenerate case where the two line elements are parallel, their distance is undefined. Since areas in $\R^2$ are invariant under equiaffine transformations, the metric on $\mathbb P$ is too. Note that in $2A^{1/3}$, the exponent of $1/3$ is necessary by an additive property of parabolas, but the factor of $2$ is merely conventional to make the equations appear simpler.

Therefore, we can speak of an equiaffine arclength on a strictly convex curve by integrating over the infinitesimal triangles formed by its successive tangent lines, which then allows us to define an equiaffine parameterization.

There is another way to produce equiaffine parameterization. A parameterization $x(t)$ is Euclidean-arclength iff the vector $\dot x(t)$ is unit length. Analogously, a parameterization $x(t)$ is equiaffine-arclength iff the two vectors $\dot x(t), \ddot x(t)$ span unit-area parallelogram for all $t$.

==== Additivity on a parabola ====
Additivity of $2A^{1/3}$ on a parabola.

In coordinates, consider the following parameterized parabola:
$$x(t) = x_0 + \dot x_0 t + \frac 12 \ddot x_0 t^2$$
It passes a point $x_0$, with tangent in the direction of $\dot x_0$, and with axis in the direction of $\ddot x_0$.

Consider two points on the parabola $x(t_1), x(t_2)$. The two tangent lines form a triangle. By direct computation, the triangle has area $A = \tfrac 18 (t_2-t_1)^3 |\dot x_0 \times \ddot x_0|$. This then means that given two line elements along the parabola $(x(t_1), \dot x(t_1)), (x(t_2), \dot x(t_2))$, we have
$$d((x(t_1), \dot x(t_1)), (x(t_2), \dot x(t_2))) = (t_2 - t_1) |\dot x_0  \times \ddot x_0|^{1/3}$$
We see that the equiaffine arclength is invariant under subdivisions of the same parabola, meaning the equiaffine arclength converges to a well-defined limit under increasingly fine subdivisions.

In particular, we see that this is an affine parameterization of the parabola. It becomes an equiaffine parameterization after an affine scaling of $t$.

In particular, $t \mapsto (t, \tfrac 12 t^2)$ is an equiaffine parameterization.

=== Equiaffine curvature ===
The equiaffine arclength construction relies on approximating a curve as a sequence of osculating parabolas. Obviously, osculating parabolas of a parabola are just the parabola itself. However, for a generic strictly convex curve, its osculating parabolas change over the arclength. This can be used to define curvature in equiaffine geometry.

In a Euclidean parameterization, $\ddot x$ is perpendicular to $\dot x$, so it has the natural parametrization, defined by $\kappa(t)$ where $\kappa(t)$ is the rate at which its unit-velocity vector is turning. That is, $\ddot x(t) = \kappa(t) \dot x^\perp (t)$, where $\dot x^\perp (t)$ is $\dot x(t)$ rotated clockwise by a right angle.

Similarly, in an equiaffine parameterization, $x^{(3)}$ is parallel to $\dot x$, so it has the natural parametrization, defined by $\kappa(t)$ where $\kappa(t)$ is the rate at which its affine-normal is shearing: $x^{(3)}(t) + k(t) \dot x(t) = 0$. The quantity $k(t)$ is the equiaffine curvature.

The parabola is the only curve with $k = 0$. Its equiaffine parameterization is $(t, \tfrac 12 t^2)$. This shows that the parabola is analogous to the straight line, since it has zero curvature.

The ellipse is the only curve with constant positive curvature $k > 0$. Its equiaffine parameterization is
$$\begin{cases}
& x_1=a \cos (k)^{1 / 2} t, \; x_2=b \sin (k)^{1 / 2} t, \\
& \frac{x_1^2}{a^2}+\frac{x_2^2}{b^2}=1, \; k=(a b)^{-2 / 3} .
\end{cases}$$
or equivalently, $k = (\pi/A)^{2/3}$ where $A$ is its area.

The hyperbola with is the only curve with constant negative curvature $k < 0$. Its equiaffine parameterization is
$$\begin{cases}
& x_1=a \cosh (-k)^{1 / 2} s, \; x_2=b \sinh (-k)^{1 / 2} s, \\
& \frac{x_1^2}{a^2}-\frac{x_2^2}{b^2}=1, \; k=-(a b)^{-2 / 3} .
\end{cases}$$
The Euclidean curvature of a curve at a point is obtained by finding the unique degree-3 osculating circle. Similarly, the affine curvature is obtained by finding the unique degree-5 osculating conic section.

Where the equiaffine curvature reaches a generic local maximum or minimum, the corresponding focal point reaches a semicubical cusp.

== Affine geometry in space ==
Let $M$ be a parameterized surface $M \subset \R^3$.

=== Normal form ===
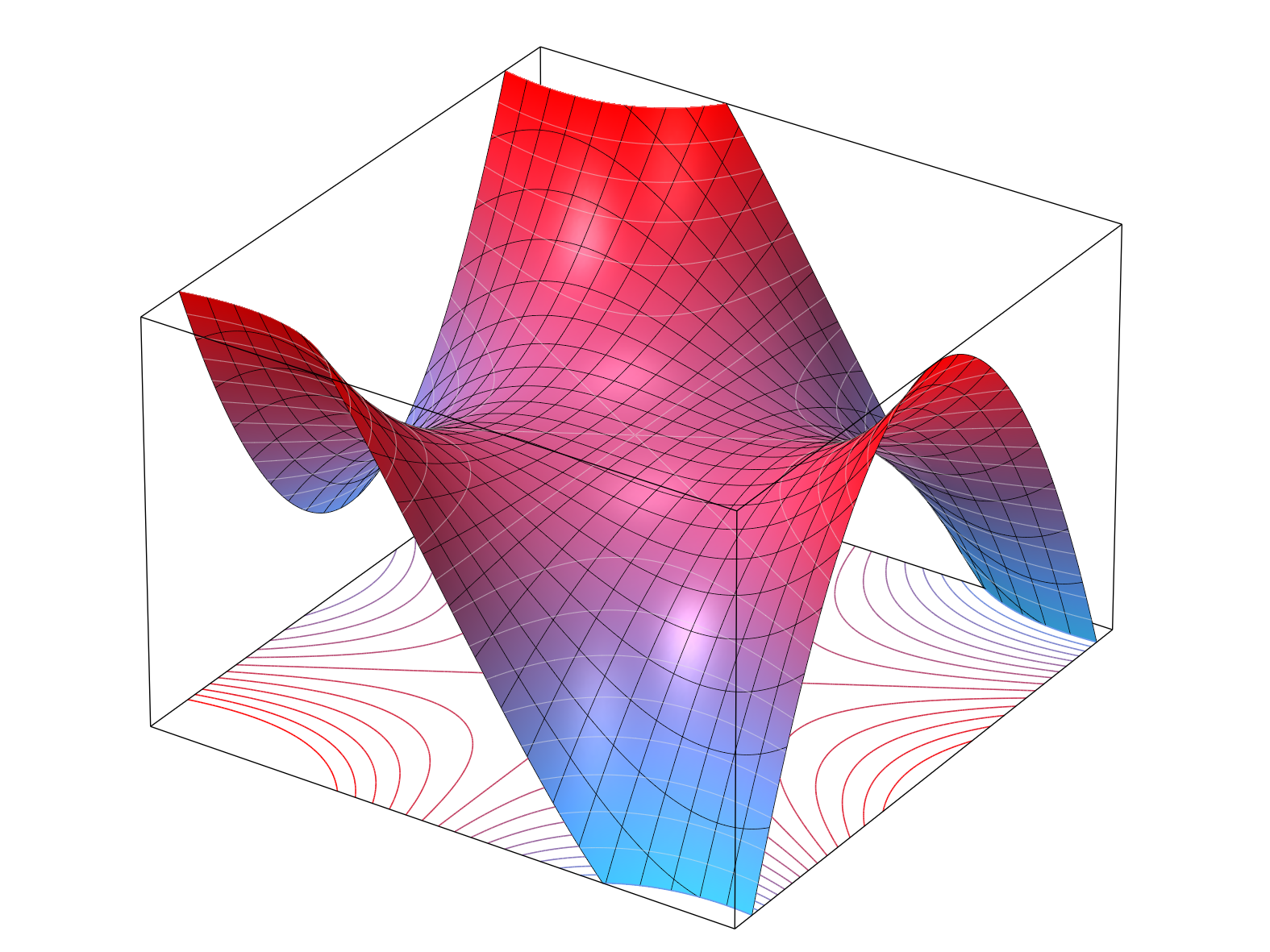
The monkey saddle

At a generic elliptic point $x \in M$, the surface can be transformed via an equiaffine transformation into a normal form:
$$z = \frac 12 (x^2 + y^2) + \frac c6 (x^3 - 3xy^2) + \cdots$$
Or in cylindrical coordinates, $z = \tfrac 12 \rho^2 + c\rho^3 \cos(3\varphi) + O(\rho^4)$.

To obtain the transformation, first perform a Euclidean transformation, so that the tangent plane is moved to the $z = 0$ plane, with the two axes of the Dupin indicatrix pointing in the $x, y$ directions, then perform a volume-preserving stretch in the $x, y, z$ directions. In other words, locally the surface is a paraboloid modified by a monkey saddle.

Since rotating around the axis paraboloid axis by 60° flips the sign of $c$, only $c^2$ is a well-defined quantity in equiaffine geometry.

there is a 2-parameter family of planes. Generically, each plane intersects the surface at a curve, which has an equiaffine curvature at $x$. This is the corresponding equiaffine sectional curvature.

A deltoid curve in normal form.

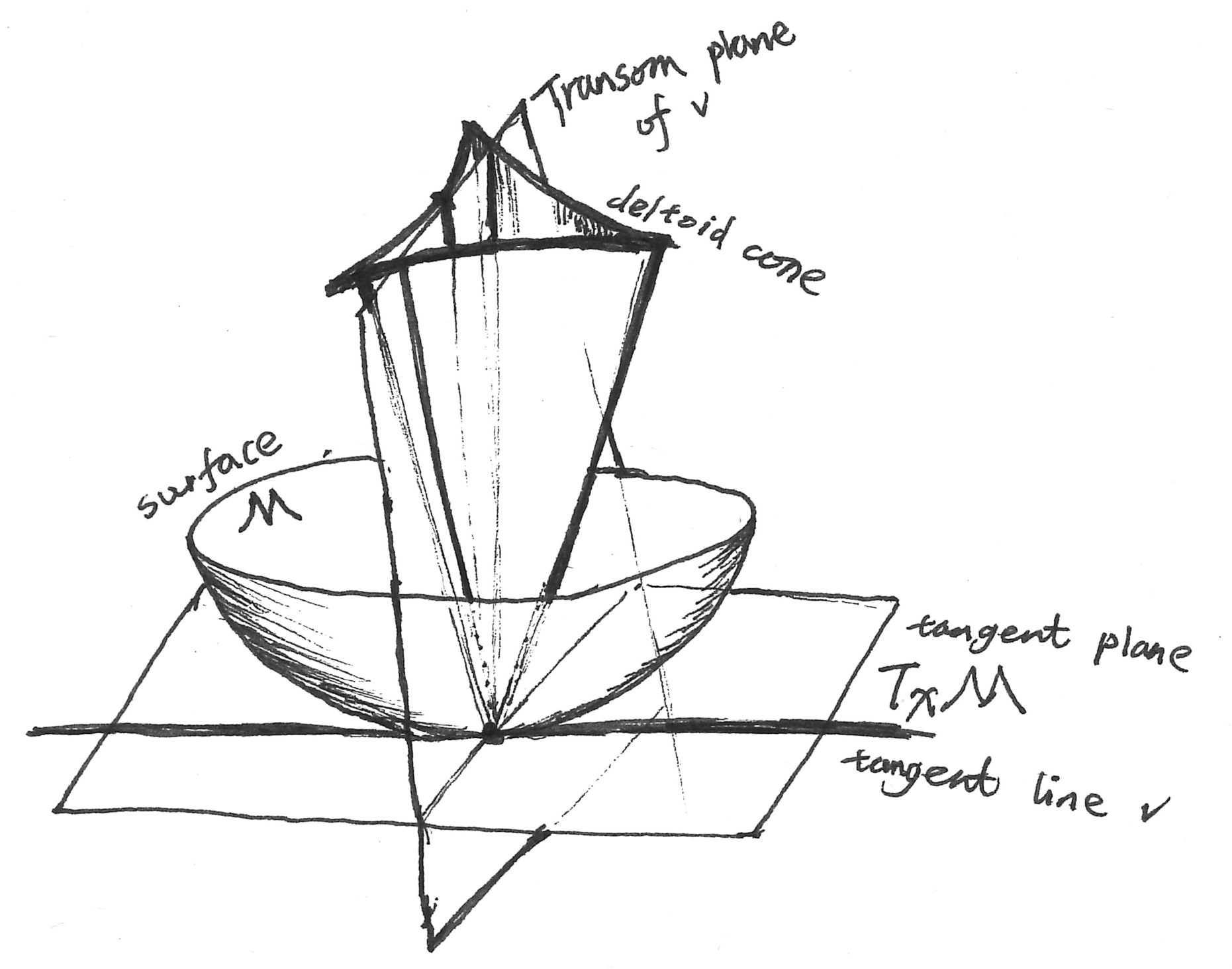
The Transom plane construction.

For each unit vector $v \in T_x M$, there is a 2-parameter family of lines in the same direction near $x$. Generically, each line intersects $M$ at two points, and their midpoints make up a curved surface passing $x$. Its tangent plane at $x(u_0, v_0)$ is the Transon plane corresponding to the line element $(x, v)$. As the unit vector rotates, it sweeps out a 1-parameter family of Transon planes. The envelope surface of these planes is a deltoid curve cone apexed at $x$, and has an in-ellipse. This is related to the focal surface of the elliptical umbilic.

The central line of the deltoid cone is the affine normal of the surface at $x$.

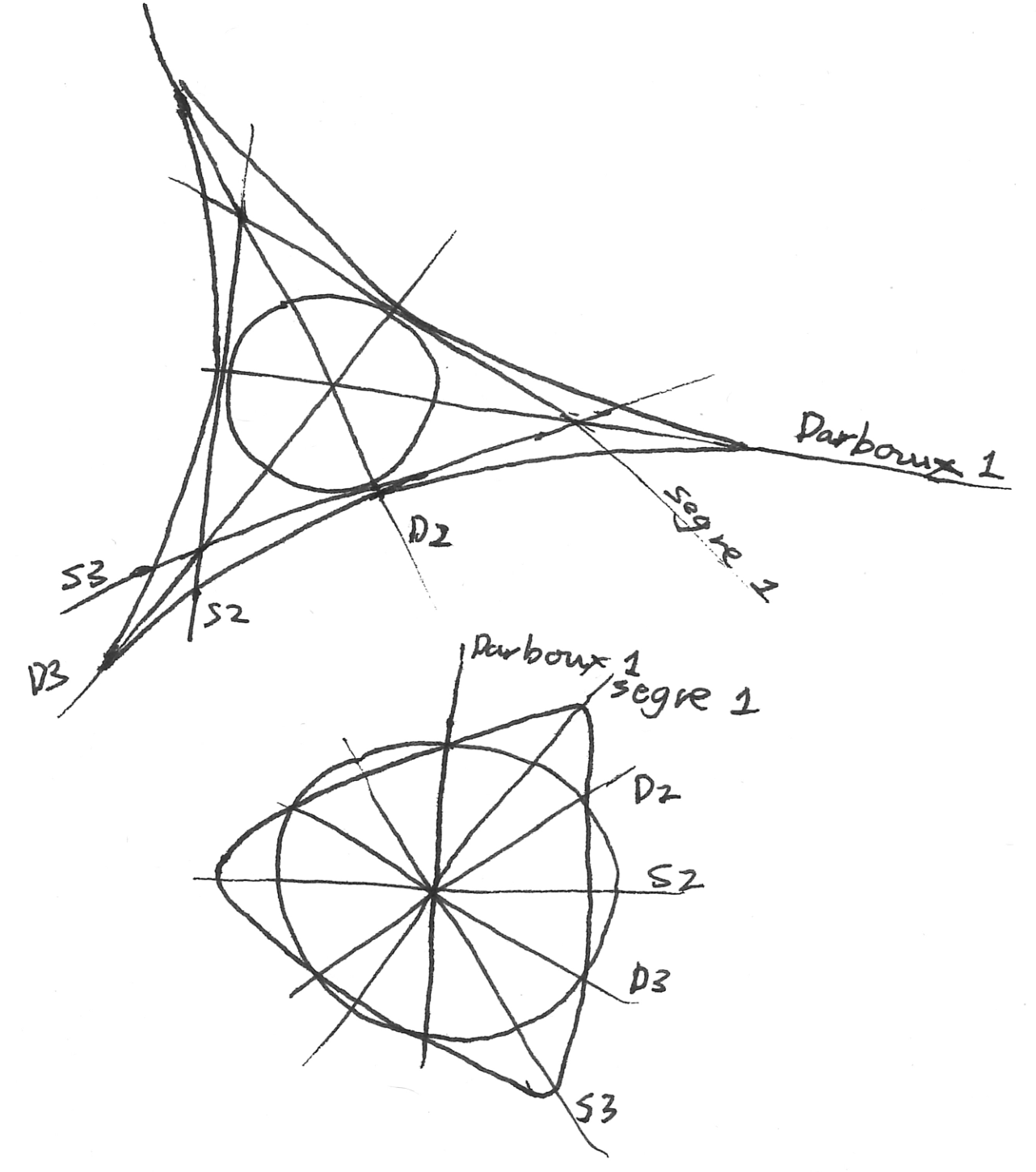
The bottom subfigure shows two Dupin indicatrices, one being of $z = \tfrac 12 \rho^2 + c\rho^3 \cos(3\varphi) + O(\rho^4)$ and the other being of $z = \tfrac 12 \rho^2$. They intersect at 3 lines, being the 3 Darboux tangents. They are dual to the 3 Segre tangents. The top subfigure shows the corresponding deltoid cone, with the 6 Transon planes shown as 6 lines. The 3 Darboux tangents correspond to the 3 lines through the 3 deltoid cusps, and the 3 Segre tangents correspond to the 3 lines tangent to the in-circles.

On the deltoid cone, 6 points are special: the 3 cusps, and the 3 tangents to its in-ellipse. They correspond to 6 Transon planes, which correspond to the 3 Darboux tangents (for the cusps), and the 3 Segre tangents of the surface at $x$.

The 3 Darboux tangents can also be found by intersecting $z = \tfrac 12 \rho^2 + c\rho^3 \cos(3\varphi) + O(\rho^4)$ with the most osculating paraboloid $z = \tfrac 12 \rho^2$. The intersection looks like an umbrella with 3 pairs of spines, which are the 3 Darboux tangents.

=== Blaschke metric ===
Since at each elliptical point, there is only one equiaffine transformation (up to rotation by 120°) that transforms the surface to its normal form
$$z = \frac 12 (x^2 + y^2) + \frac c6 (x^3 - 3xy^2) + \cdots$$
the positive-definite quadratic form $ds^2 = dx^2 + dy^2$ is well-defined in equiaffine geometry. This is the Blaschke metric, or Berwald–Blaschke metric.

Given a curve on the surface, integration of the Blaschke metric along it produces the same result as the previously constructed equiaffine arclength. Thus, the metric structure of equiaffine geometry of the surface is the same as the metric structure of a Riemannian geometry, though this does not reduce equiaffine geometry to Riemannian geometry (discussed below).

The Blaschke metric can also be defined without first transforming the surface to its normal form. Let $M$ be a smooth and locally strictly convex hypersurface in $\R^{n+1}$, and suppose locally near a point, the surface is the graph of a function $x^0 = f(x^1, \dots, x^n)$, then the Blaschke metric is
$$ds^2 = |\det [\partial_{ij} f]|^{-\frac{1}{n+2}} \partial_{ij} f \; dx^i dx^j$$
where $i, j$ ranges over $1:n$. This definition is invariant under equiaffine transformations of the ambient space $\R^{n+1}$.

== The immersed manifold perspective ==
Riemannian geometry can be studied by immersing manifolds in $\R^n$, regarded as a Riemannian manifold. Similarly, affine differential geometry can be studied by immersing manifolds in $\R^n$, regarded as an affine manifold.

=== Affine fundamental form ===
In the case of surfaces in Euclidean space, we have two fundamental forms: the first fundamental form and the second fundamental form. The first is the induced Riemannian metric, which describes the intrinsic metric structure of the surface. The second describes the extrinsic geometry, and can be used to define covariant derivative (i.e. parallel transport) on the surface by $\nabla_X Y = \nabla_X^{\text{ext}} Y - \mathrm{I\!I}(X,Y )$ where $\nabla_X^{\text{ext}} Y$ is the covariant derivative in the ambient Euclidean space (i.e. just the standard derivative). The second fundamental form is obtained by splitting $\nabla_v^{\text{ext}} w$ to two subspaces: the tangent plane of the surface, and the line perpendicular to the tangent plane.

For affine geometry, there is a similar construction as the second fundamental forms. Let $M$ be a locally strictly convex surface in $\R^{n+1}$. Define at each point $x \in M$ a subspace $N_x \subset T_x \R^{n+1}$ such that it is transverse to $T_x M$ everywhere. Then, for any pair of vector fields $X, Y$ on $M$, regarded as partially defined vector fields on $\R^{n+1}$, the vector field $\nabla_X^{\text{ext}} Y$ splits as $N \oplus T M$. Define $\alpha(X, Y)$ to be the component in $N$. The $\alpha$ is the affine fundamental form associated with this, and it defines the corresponding covariant derivative by $\nabla_X Y = \nabla_X^{\text{ext}} Y - \alpha(X,Y )$.

In the case where $N_x$ is 1-dimensional, and the surface is orientable, we can pick a nonvanishing transverse vector field $v$ and define a bilinear form $h(X, Y)$ by $\alpha(X, Y) = h(X, Y) v$. This is positive definite, and makes $M$ into a Riemannian manifold again.

There is also an affine shape operator, a (1, 1)-tensor defined by $S(X) = - \nabla_X^{\text{ext}} v$.

Of the many choices of $N$, the affine geometry of the ambient $\R^{n+1}$ picks one as special: the affine normals. If the affine normals are used, then the induced covariant derivative $\nabla^{\text{Bla}}$ on $M \subset \R^{n+1}$ is the Blaschke connection. Abstractly speaking, this is an immersion of affine manifolds.

Note that $h(X, Y)$ is still not well-defined, since there is no natural length scale in $N$. However, if the ambient $\R^{n+1}$ is regarded not just as an affine space, but an equiaffine space, then there is a natural length scale. Specifically, in a neighborhood of any $p \in M$, there exists an equiaffine transformation of $\R^{n+1}$ such that the surface is of normal form $x^0 = \frac 12 \sum_{i=1}^n (x_i)^2 + \cdots$. Then simply pick the $\partial_{x^0}|_p$ vector at that point. When this is used, we have an immersion of equiaffine manifolds.

Many equations in the differential geometry of surfaces, such as the Gauss–Codazzi equations, has direct analogs in affine geometry using the affine shape operator and the affine fundamental form.

At certain points, the shape operator may be an identity. Such points are umbilical points. An affine manifold where all points are umbilical points is an affine sphere.

=== Blaschke structure ===
Note that, though $M$ has both a Riemannian metric $h$ and a Blaschke connection $\nabla^{\text{Bla}}$, the Levi-Civita connection $\nabla^h$ induced by $h$ is in general different from $\nabla^{\text{Bla}}$. Whereas $\nabla^h h = 0$, in general $\nabla^{\text{Bla}} h \neq 0$. The (0, 3) tensor $C(X, Y, Z) := \nabla^{\text{Bla}}_X (h(Y, Z))$, the cubic form, is in general nonzero. A classical theorem of Pick and Berwald states that $h$ is nondegenerate and $C=0$ if and only if $M$ is a quadric.

In general, consider an abstract affine manifold $(M, \nabla)$ equipped with a nondegenerate bilinear form $h$. Then it produces a conjugate affine connection $\bar\nabla$
$$X h(Y, Z)=h(\nabla_X Y, Z)+h(Y, \bar{\nabla}_X Z)$$
Then, $\tfrac 12 (\nabla + \bar\nabla) h = 0$, so $\tfrac 12 (\nabla + \bar\nabla)$ is the Levi-Civita connection for $h$.

== The abstract manifold perspective ==
Like how Riemannian geometry is the generalization of the Euclidean differential geometry of curves and surfaces, affine differential geometry is the generalization of the affine differential geometry of curves and surfaces.

Here we consider the simplest case, i.e. manifolds of codimension one. Let $M \subset \mathbb{R}^{n+1}$ be an $n$-dimensional manifold, and let $\xi$ be a vector field on $\mathbb{R}^{n+1}$ transverse to $M$ such that $T_{p}\mathbb{R}^{n+1} = T_{p}M \oplus \text{Span}(\xi)$ for all $p \in M$ where $\oplus$ denotes the direct sum and $\text{Span}$ the linear span.

For a smooth manifold, say N, let Ψ(N) denote the module of smooth vector fields over N. Let D : Ψ(R^{n+1})×Ψ(R^{n+1}) → Ψ(R^{n+1}) be the standard covariant derivative on R^{n+1} where D(X, Y) = D_{X}Y. We can decompose D_{X}Y into a component tangent to M and a transverse component, parallel to ξ. This gives the equation of Gauss: D_{X}Y = ∇_{X}Y + h(X,Y)ξ, where ∇ : Ψ(M)×Ψ(M) → Ψ(M) is the induced connexion on M and h : Ψ(M)×Ψ(M) → R is a bilinear form. Notice that ∇ and h depend upon the choice of transverse vector field ξ. We consider only those hypersurfaces for which h is non-degenerate. This is a property of the hypersurface M and does not depend upon the choice of transverse vector field ξ. If h is non-degenerate then we say that M is non-degenerate. In the case of curves in the plane, the non-degenerate curves are those without inflexions. In the case of surfaces in 3-space, the non-degenerate surfaces are those without parabolic points.

We may also consider the derivative of ξ in some tangent direction, say X. This quantity, D_{X}ξ, can be decomposed into a component tangent to M and a transverse component, parallel to ξ. This gives the Weingarten equation: D_{X}ξ = −SX + τ(X)ξ. The type-(1,1)-tensor S : Ψ(M) → Ψ(M) is called the affine shape operator, the differential one-form τ : Ψ(M) → R is called the transverse connexion form. Again, both S and τ depend upon the choice of transverse vector field ξ.

=== The first induced volume form ===
Let Ω : Ψ(R^{n+1})^{n+1} → R be a volume form defined on R^{n+1}. We can induce a volume form on M given by ω : Ψ(M)^{n} → R given by ω(X_{1},...,X_{n}) := Ω(X_{1},...,X_{n},ξ). This is a natural definition: in Euclidean differential geometry where ξ is the Euclidean unit normal then the standard Euclidean volume spanned by X_{1},...,X_{n} is always equal to ω(X_{1},...,X_{n}). Notice that ω depends on the choice of transverse vector field ξ.

=== The second induced volume form ===
For tangent vectors X_{1},...,X_{n} let H := (h_{i,j}) be the n × n matrix given by h_{i,j} := h(X_{i},X_{j}). We define a second volume form on M given by ν : Ψ(M)^{n} → R, where ν(X_{1},...,X_{n}) := |det(H)|^{1/2}. Again, this is a natural definition to make. If M = R^{n} and h is the Euclidean scalar product then ν(X_{1},...,X_{n}) is always the standard Euclidean volume spanned by the vectors X_{1},...,X_{n}. Since h depends on the choice of transverse vector field ξ it follows that ν does too.

=== Two natural conditions ===
We impose two natural conditions. The first is that the induced connexion ∇ and the induced volume form ω be compatible, i.e. ∇ω ≡ 0. This means that ∇_{X}ω = 0 for all X ∈ Ψ(M). In other words, if we parallel transport the vectors X_{1},...,X_{n} along some curve in M, with respect to the connexion ∇, then the volume spanned by X_{1},...,X_{n}, with respect to the volume form ω, does not change. A direct calculation shows that ∇_{X}ω = τ(X)ω and so ∇_{X}ω = 0 for all X ∈ Ψ(M) if, and only if, τ ≡ 0, i.e. D_{X}ξ ∈ Ψ(M) for all X ∈ Ψ(M). This means that the derivative of ξ, in a tangent direction X, with respect to D always yields a, possibly zero, tangent vector to M. The second condition is that the two volume forms ω and ν coincide, i.e. ω ≡ ν.

=== The conclusion ===
It can be shown that there is, up to sign, a unique choice of transverse vector field ξ for which the two conditions that ∇ω ≡ 0 and ω ≡ ν are both satisfied. These two special transverse vector fields are called affine normal vector fields, or sometimes called Blaschke normal fields. From its dependence on volume forms for its definition we see that the affine normal vector field is invariant under volume preserving affine transformations. These transformations are given by SL(n+1,R) ⋉ R^{n+1}, where SL(n+1,R) denotes the special linear group of (n+1) × (n+1) matrices with real entries and determinant 1, and ⋉ denotes the semi-direct product. SL(n+1,R) ⋉ R^{n+1} forms a Lie group.

== Structures ==
This section based on.

For convenience, we always assume the manifold is path-connected, since if it is not, then we can study each component separately.

=== Flat affine geometry ===
$\mathbb A^n$ is $\R^n$ regarded as an affine geometry. It is flat, that is, with curvature zero.

There is only one k-simplex, one k-ellipsoid, and one k-parallelopiped for each of $k = 1, 2, \dots, n$.

There is no length of a line segment, but the length ratio of two directed line segments on the same line is well-defined. Similarly, the separation between two parallel planes is not well-defined, but the ratio of directed separations is well-defined.

The centroid of a compact subset is well-defined.

=== Geodesics ===
An affine manifold has an affine connection (by default assumed to be torsion-free), and can be written as $(M, \nabla)$. It allows defining many structures that appears also in Riemannian geometry. First, covariant derivative or parallel transport is defined by $\nabla$, and is essentially equivalent to the connection itself. This then allows geodesics to be defined as curves $\gamma$ such that $\nabla_{\dot \gamma} \dot\gamma$ is parallel to $\dot \gamma$. Every geodesic has an affine parameterization that is unique up to an affine change of variables.

The affine parameterization satisfies $\nabla_{\dot \gamma} \dot\gamma = 0$, or more succinctly, $\ddot \gamma = 0$. Using the affine parameterization, the ratio of two directed segments on a geodesic is well-defined. Geodesics can thus be thought of as straight embeddings of the affine line $\mathbb A^1$. Note that it is meaningless in general to speak of a constant-speed curve when the curve is not a geodesic, because we cannot compare the length-ratio of two vectors not lying on the same affine line.

A geodesic is complete iff it is extended forwards and backwards for all time. That is, it has an affine parameterization of type $\R \to M$. If all its geodesics are complete, then $(M, \nabla)$ is geodesically complete. If there is no way to complete it, i.e. no geodesically complete affine manifold $\bar M$ such that $M \subset \bar M$, then $M$ is essentially geodesically incomplete.

At any point $x \in M$ and any direction $v \in T_xM$ there exists a unique affinely parameterized geodesic $\gamma$ such that $\gamma_v(0) = x, \; \dot\gamma_v(0) = v$. Thus, if we arbitrarily fix a constant $t_0 > 0$, then the map $v \mapsto \gamma_v(t_0)$ defines the exponential map, which maps an open neighborhood of zero in $T_x M$ to $M$ itself. The precise choice of $t_0$ does not matter, but there is no natural choice in general, since unlike in Riemannian manifold case, there is no natural way to measure distance on a tangent space. For convenience, we arbitrarily fix $t_0 = 1$, and define the exponential map as $\exp_x(v) = \gamma_v(1)$.

=== Killing ===
An affine Killing vector field is a vector field $X$ that preserves the affine connection. That is, $\mathcal L_X(\nabla) = 0$, where $\mathcal L$ is the Lie derivative. In particular, infinitesimal parallelopipeds are still parallelopipeds when flowing under the Killing vector field. The set of affine Killing vector fields on $(M, \nabla)$ with the Lie bracket $[\cdot, \cdot]$ makes for a Lie algebra $\mathfrak{K}(M, \nabla)$.

A vector field is complete iff the integral curves exist for all time. A complete Killing vector field generates a 1-parameter family of affine diffeomorphisms of $M$ to itself.

$(M, \nabla)$ is affine Killing complete iff every affine Killing vector field is complete.

The group of affine diffeomorphisms mapping $(M, \nabla)$ to itself is $\operatorname{Aff}(M, \nabla)$. It is a finite-dimensional Lie group. Its Lie algebra $\mathfrak{aff}(M, \nabla)$ is the Lie subalgebra of $\mathfrak{K}(M, \nabla)$ consisting of the affine Killing complete vector fields.

=== Morphisms ===
An affine diffeomorphism is a diffeomorphism that preserves the affine connection. A local affine diffeomorphism is an affine diffeomorphism restricted on only an open subset.

An affine covering map is a function between two affine manifolds $f: M \to N$, such that any $x \in M$ has an open neighborhood in which $f$ restricts to an affine diffeomorphism.

An affine manifold is (locally) symmetric iff for any two points $x, y \in M$, there exists a (local) affine diffeomorphism mapping $x$ to $y$. For example, any (locally) symmetric pseudo-Riemannian space is automatically (locally) symmetric as an affine manifold.

Intuitively, a locally symmetric manifold is one that, if one stands at any point of it, and looks out from it, one cannot discover where one is (unless one looks so far that global geometry comes to play). Similarly, a symmetric manifold is one that, if one stands at any point of it, and looks out from it, one cannot discover where one is, no matter how far one looks.

Given a smooth submanifold $N \subset M$, it is totally geodesic iff any $x \in N, \; v \in T_x N$, the geodesic in $M$ passing $(x, v)$ is entirely contained in $N$. For such manifolds, the affine connection on the bigger manifold is an affine connection on the submanifold, so the submanifold is an affine manifold in a natural way.

Explicitly, given a point $x \in N$, and a direction to transport $v \in T_x N$, we transport $T_xN$ as if it is a subspace of $T_x M$ transported along $v \in T_x M$ using a geodesic curve $\gamma(t)$. The transported $T_xN$ becomes a subspace of $T_{\gamma(t)}M$. Because $N$ is totally geodesic in $M$, the transported $T_xN$ is equal to $T_{\gamma(t)} N$.

=== Immersion ===
In general, a differentiable manifold immersion $f : N \to M$ is not totally geodesic, in that the geodesics of $M$ that start on $f(N)$ may immediately leave $f(N)$. In the Riemannian case, where a second fundamental form bends geodesics in $M$ to the nearest curves in $f(N)$. In the affine case, we can similarly define affine fundamental forms, though there is no longer a unique natural choice.

Suppose that $(N, \nabla), (M, \nabla')$ are affine manifolds. At any $x \in N$, we pick some $V_x$ such that $T_{f(x)} M = f^*(T_xN) \oplus V_x$, and the choice of $V_x$ varies smoothly as $x \in N$ varies. The subspaces $V_x$ can be interpreted as a choice of transverse directions to the immersion. There is no natural choice unlike in Riemannian geometry, since perpendicularity is undefined.

An affine fundamental form is some multilinear map $\alpha$ that takes two vector fields $X, Y$ on $N$ and produces a vector field in $V$, such that
$$\nabla'_X f_*(Y) = f_*(\nabla_X Y) + \alpha(X, Y)$$
In words, it states that the affine transport on $(N, \nabla)$ can be equivalently performed by doing the affine transporting in $(M, \nabla')$, plus a correction in a transverse direction.

We say $f: N \to M$ is an affine immersion iff there exists such an affine fundamental form.

An affine immersion is totally geodesic iff its affine fundamental form is zero.

=== Coordinates ===
Given a local coordinate chart $(x^1, \dots, x^n) : M \supset U \to \R^n$, it produces a set of vector fields $\partial_1, \dots, \partial_n$ spanning the tangent bundle. The Christoffel symbols are defined in the same way as in Riemannian geometry:
$$\nabla_{\partial_i} \partial_j = \Gamma_{ij}^k \partial_k$$
In Riemannian geometry, the normal coordinates at a point $p \in M$ causes the Christoffel symbols of the Levi-Civita connection to vanish at that specific point. It is constructed using the geodesics via the exponential map $\exp_p : T_p M \supset U \to M$. This construction still works for an affine connection. In this way, one can regard $M$ as "locally equivalent to $\mathbb A^n$", since $\mathbb A^n \cong T_pM$.

This construction requires torsion-freeness, because normal coordinates exist iff the torsion is zero. This is one reason affine geometry usually assumes that the affine connection is torsion-free.

Instead of using coordinates, one can also use the vielbein formalism.

=== Curvature ===
In affine geometry, as in Riemannian geometry, curvature encodes all local features of affine geometry. Specifically, there is a (1, 3)-tensor called the curvature tensor, defined in the same way:
$$R(X, Y) := \nabla_X \nabla_Y -  \nabla_Y \nabla_X  - \nabla_{[X,Y]}$$
Similarly, there is a (0, 2)-tensor obtained by contracting the tensor, called the Ricci curvature tensor:
$$\operatorname{Ric}(X, Y) := \operatorname{Tr}(Z \mapsto R(Z, X)Y)$$
though unlike in Riemannian geometry, the Ricci curvature tensor could be asymmetric. Consequently, it splits to a symmetric and antisymmetric part.

An affine manifold is flat iff its curvature tensor is zero. Similarly for Ricci-flat.

$\operatorname{Ric}$ is symmetric on an open subset $U \subset M$ if and only if there exists a volume form on $U$ invariant under parallel transport.

If there is an affinely parameterized geodesic $\gamma : (t_0, t_1) \to M$ such that $\operatorname{Ric}(\dot \gamma, \dot \gamma) \to \pm\infty$ at either end, then there is no way to extend it further along that end, and thus it is essentially incomplete (rather than incidentally).

Statements:

- If $\nabla R = 0$, then $(M, \nabla)$ is locally symmetric.
- If $\operatorname{Ric}$ is full-ranked, then $\operatorname{Ric}$ can be interpreted as a pseudo-Riemannian form, making $(M, \operatorname{Ric})$ a pseudo-Riemannian manifold, though its Levi-Civita connection might not be $\nabla$.
- If $\nabla R = 0$ and $\operatorname{Ric}$ is full-ranked, then the Levi-Civita connection of $(M, \operatorname{Ric})$ is $\nabla$. Thus, in this case, the affine manifold is canonically just a locally symmetric pseudo-Riemannian manifold.
- $(M, \nabla)$ is locally symmetric if and only if at each point $x$ the geodesic symmetry $y \mapsto \exp_x(-\exp_x^{-1}(y))$ is an affine diffeomorphism. Note that the geodesic symmetry generalizes point reflection.

More generally, An affine manifold $(M, \nabla)$ is metrizable iff we can impose a pseudo-Riemannian form $g$ on $M$, such that $\nabla$ is the Levi-Civita connection for $g$.

Note a subtlety with the Blaschke metric. For any smooth orientable hypersurface in $M \subset \R^n$, we can define the equiaffine arclengths of curves on $M$ using the Blaschke metric, which then makes $M$ into a Riemannian manifold. But the Levi-Civita connection for the Blaschke metric may not be the Blaschke connection. Indeed, if the surface is strictly convex but not a quadratic surface, then they are not the same connection.

=== Affine surfaces ===
If $M$ has 2 dimensions, it is an affine surface. Affine surfaces have special properties.

If $\nabla R = 0$, then $\operatorname{Ric}$ is symmetric. Unlike the statement in the previous section, this does not require the assumption that $\operatorname{Ric}$ is full-ranked, so $(M, \operatorname{Ric})$ might not be a pseudo-Riemannian manifold.

As for Riemannian surfaces, an affine surface is flat iff it is Ricci-flat.

== Problems ==
Some basic problems in affine differential geometry are:

- whether an affine manifold is metrizable;
- whether an affine manifold can immerse in another affine manifold;
- whether an affine manifold can be geodesically completed;
- classifying affine spheres;
- classifying affine maximal surfaces;
- global structures, especially in its interactions with algebraic geometry;
- etc.

== See also ==
- Affine geometry of curves
- Affine focal set
- Affine sphere
- Affine maximal surface
