= Abel Transon =

Abel Étienne Louis Transon (25 December 1805 – 23 August 1876) was a French mathematician, utopian socialist and journalist.

== Life ==
Abel Transon was born in Versailles on 25 December 1805 (Christmas Day). In 1823 he won a mathematical competition and was admitted to the prestigious École Polytechnique, from which he graduated with top honours in 1825. Like many of his fellow Polytechniciens, (e.g., Prosper Enfantin, Olinde Rodrigues, Jules Lechevalier, Michel Chevalier and others), he was attracted to the doctrines of Henri de Saint-Simon. He contributed to Le Globe and was a frequent and popular orator at the Salle Taitbout. Like other Saint-Simonians, Transon believed in the equality of the sexes, but his special rapport with women induced the Saint-Simonian leader 'Père' Enfantin, to proclaim him the sect's 'apostle to the ladies'. However, when the Saint-Simonian school split in 1832, after a dispute between its leaders, Prosper Enfantin and Saint-Amand Bazard, Transon defected to the followers of Charles Fourier. He contributed to the journals of Victor Considerant, notably writing a number of articles on education. In 1834 he gave a series of lectures at the Society of Civilisation, concerning certain proposals for the mechanisation of agriculture. In 1834 he returned to the Catholic Church. He was an admirer of the Polish mystic Józef Maria Hoene-Wroński. He seems to have taken little part in politics after 1835, though he remained on friendly terms with his former utopian socialist colleagues, especially Jules Lechevalier, Hippolyte Renaud and Charles Pellarin. Transon's mother died in 1835, an event that greatly affected him and accelerated his transition to Catholicism and mysticism. Unlike more conservative Catholic philosophers of the time, Transon was and remained in favour of democracy.

In later years, he concentrated mostly on mathematics. He worked as a tutor and later as an examiner at the Polytechnique, was a member of the Mining Corps and wrote mathematical articles for the Journal de Mathématiques Pures et Appliquées, the Nouvelles Annales de Mathématiques, the Journal de l'École Polytechnique and other publications. He made numerous contributions to geometry, calculus and algebra. For example, he was a pioneer of the calculus of aberrancy. Transon's parabola is named for him. Transon's theorem states that the effect of any analytic transformation upon an infinitesimal region is the same as that of a projective transformation. Among the many topics he worked on was Fermat's Last Theorem. He complained: "I am tormented by two maladies, my rheumatism and my Fermatism." In 1845, he married Félicie Desnoyers. In 1849 Transon had the first serious bout of rheumatism, an ailment that plagued him the rest of his life. He also developed a heart condition as well as arteriosclerosis, according to the physician Pellarin. Charles Pellarin, in his Notice sur Jules Lechevalier et Abel Transon (1877), contrasts Transon's nervous, artistic temperament and sincere piety with Lechevalier's expansive love of the finer things, and attributes a certain lack of psychological freedom on Transon's part to his 'religious distraction.' Pellarin draws an affectionate portrait of Transon and his wife as very charitable. In the late 1860s, Transon was informed that the aged and ailing socialist Pierre Leroux was in financial distress. Transon arranged to purchase all of Leroux' publications. When Leroux found out who the buyer was, he visited Transon and said: "My dear Transon, I know you have neither need of, nor interest in, my books, but I divine the intention, thank you." Transon protested that, even though their ideas were very different, the works of a man of such value as Leroux were always interesting, and that he was curious about his book on Job.

Transon lived in Paris during the Franco-Prussian War and the Paris Commune, but he was already ill, and the privations of that time made his health worse. Nevertheless, he volunteered for the National Guard and was used to keep order at butcheries and bakeries during the distribution of rations. In the aftermath of the Paris Commune, Transon reproached himself and his former socialist colleagues for, as he now saw it, raising false hopes among the people and propounding erroneous doctrines. Pelarin accepted Transon's criticisms as being motivated by his "esteem and affection", but categorically rejected the accusation. "The scrupulous Transon calumnies his past," he wrote, pointing out that neither the Saint-Simonians nor the Fourierists had ever encouraged insurrection and had often been criticised by revolutionary socialists for this. In 1872 he was awarded the French Legion of Honour. He died on 23 August 1876 of complications from his heart disease. According to Pellarin it was a long and difficult death, born bravely.

== Works ==
- De la Réligion Saint-Simonienne. Paris, 1831.
- Théorie Sociétaire de Charles Fourier. Paris, 1832.
- 'Recherches sur les Courbures des Lignes et des Surfaces.' Journal de M. Liouville. Paris, 1841. Nouvelles Annales de Mathématiques. Vol. 2, 1870.
- 'Mémoire sur les Propriétés d'un Ensemble de Droites menées de tous les Points de l'Espace suivant une Loi Continue.' Journal de l'École Polytechnique, 1861.
- 'De la Projection Gauche.' Nouvelles Annales de Mathématiques, 1865 and 1866.
- 'Études sur les Roulettes.' Nouvelles Annales, Vol. IV, 1845.
- 'De l'Algèbre Directive et de ses Applications à la Géométrie.' Nouvelles Annales de Mathématiques, 1868, 1869, 1875.
- De l'Infini ou Métaphysique et Géométrie à l'Occasion d'une Pseudo-Géométrie. Paris, 1871.

There are many other mathematical titles.

== Sources ==
- Tournaire, M., 'Notice Nécrologique sur Abel Transon, Ingénieur en chef des Mines'. Annales des Mines, 7th series vol. 14, 1878.
- Pellarin, Ch., Notice sur Jules Lechevalier et Abel Transon: Une Page de l'Histoire du Saint-Simonisme & du Fouriérisme. Paris, 1877.
