= Affine focal set =

In mathematics, and especially affine differential geometry, the affine focal set of a smooth submanifold M embedded in a smooth manifold N is the caustic generated by the affine normal lines. It can be realised as the bifurcation set of a certain family of functions. The bifurcation set is the set of parameter values of the family which yield functions with degenerate singularities. This is not the same as the bifurcation diagram in dynamical systems.

Assume that M is an n-dimensional smooth hypersurface in real (n+1)-space. Assume that M has no points where the second fundamental form is degenerate. From the article affine differential geometry, there exists a unique transverse vector field over M. This is the affine normal vector field, or the Blaschke normal field. A special (i.e. det = 1) affine transformation of real (n + 1)-space will carry the affine normal vector field of M onto the affine normal vector field of the image of M under the transformation.

== Geometric interpretation ==
Consider a local parametrisation of M. Let $U \subset \mathbb{R}^{n}$ be an open neighbourhood of 0 with coordinates $\mathbf{u} = (u_1,\ldots,u_n)$, and let $\mathbf{X} : U \to \mathbb{R}^{n+1}$ be a smooth parametrisation of M in a neighbourhood of one of its points.

The affine normal vector field will be denoted by $\mathbf{A}$. At each point of M it is transverse to the tangent space of M, i.e.

$$\mathbf{A} : U \to T_{\mathbf{X}(U)}\mathbb{R}^{n+1}. \,$$

For a fixed $\mathbf{u}_0 \in U$ the affine normal line to M at $\mathbf{X}(\mathbf{u}_0)$ may be parametrised by t where

$$t \mapsto \mathbf{X}(\mathbf{u}_0) + t \mathbf{A}(\mathbf{u}_0).$$

The affine focal set is given geometrically as the infinitesimal intersections of the n-parameter family of affine normal lines. To calculate, choose an affine normal line, say at point p; then look at the affine normal lines at points infinitesimally close to p and see if any intersect the one at p. If p is infinitesimally close to $\mathbf{u} \in U$, then it may be expressed as $\mathbf{u} + d\mathbf{u}$ where $d\mathbf{u}$ represents the infinitesimal difference. Thus $\mathbf{X}(\mathbf{u})$ and $\mathbf{X}(\mathbf{u} + d\mathbf{u})$ will be our p and its neighbour.

Solve for t and $d\mathbf{u}$.

$$\mathbf{X}(\mathbf{u}) + t \mathbf{A}(\mathbf{u}) = \mathbf{X}(\mathbf{u} + d\mathbf{u}) + t \mathbf{A}(\mathbf{u} + d\mathbf{u}).$$

This can be done by using power series expansions, and is not too difficult; it is lengthy and has thus been omitted.

Recalling from the article affine differential geometry, the affine shape operator S is a type (1,1)-tensor field on M, and is given by $Sv = D_v\mathbf{A}$, where D is the covariant derivative on real (n + 1)-space (for those well read: it is the usual flat and torsion free connexion).

The solutions to $\mathbf{X}(\mathbf{u}) + t \mathbf{A}(\mathbf{u}) = \mathbf{X}(\mathbf{u} + d\mathbf{u}) + t \mathbf{A}(\mathbf{u} + d\mathbf{u})$ are when 1/t is an eigenvalue of S and that $d\mathbf{u}$ is a corresponding eigenvector. The eigenvalues of S are not always distinct: there may be repeated roots, there may be complex roots, and S may not always be diagonalisable. For $0 \le k \le [n/2]$, where $[-]$ denotes the greatest integer function, there will generically be (n − 2k)-pieces of the affine focal set above each point p. The −2k corresponds to pairs of eigenvalues becoming complex (like the solution to $x^2 + a = 0$ as a changes from negative to positive).

The affine focal set need not be made up of smooth hypersurfaces. In fact, for a generic hypersurface M, the affine focal set will have singularities. The singularities could be found by calculation, but that may be difficult, and there is no idea of what the singularity looks like up to diffeomorphism. Using singularity theory gives much more information.

== Singularity theory approach ==
The idea here is to define a family of functions over M. The family will have the ambient real (n + 1)-space as its parameter space, i.e. for each choice of ambient point there is function defined over M. This family is the family of affine distance functions:

$$\Delta : \mathbb{R}^{n+1} \times  M \to \mathbb{R}.\,$$

Given an ambient point $\mathbf{x}$ and a surface point p, it is possible to decompose the chord joining p to $\mathbf{x}$ as a tangential component and a transverse component parallel to $\mathbf{A}$. The value of Δ is given implicitly in the equation

$$\mathbf{x} - p = Z(\mathbf{x},p) + \Delta(\mathbf{x},p) \mathbf{A}(p)$$

where Z is a tangent vector. Now, what is sought is the bifurcation set of the family Δ, i.e. the ambient points for which the restricted function

$$\Delta : \{\mathbf{x}\} \times M \to \mathbb{R}$$

has degenerate singularity at some p. A function has degenerate singularity if both the Jacobian matrix of first order partial derivatives and the Hessian matrix of second order partial derivatives have zero determinant.

To discover if the Jacobian matrix has zero determinant, differentiating the equation x - p = Z + ΔA is needed. Let X be a tangent vector to M, and differentiate in that direction:

$$D_X(\mathbf{x}-p) = D_X(Z + \Delta \mathbf{A}),$$

$$-X = \nabla_XZ + h(X,Z)\mathbf{A} + d_X\Delta \mathbf{A} - \Delta SX ,$$

$$(\nabla_XZ + (I - \Delta S)X) + (h(X,Z) + d_X\Delta)\mathbf{A} = 0 ,$$

where I is the identity. This means that $\nabla_XZ = (\Delta S - I)X$ and $h(X,Z) = -d_X\Delta$. The last equality says that we have the following equation of differential one-forms $h(-,Z) = d\Delta$. The Jacobian matrix will have zero determinant if, and only if, $d\Delta$ is degenerate as a one-form, i.e. $d_X\Delta = 0$ for all tangent vectors X. Since $h(-,Z) = d\Delta$ it follows that $d\Delta$ is degenerate if, and only if, $h(-,Z)$ is degenerate. Since h is a non-degenerate two-form it follows that Z = 0. Notice that since M has a non-degenerate second fundamental form it follows that h is a non-degenerate two-form. Since Z = 0 the set of ambient points x for which the restricted function $\Delta : \{\mathbf{x}\} \times M \to \mathbb{R}$ has a singularity at some p is the affine normal line to M at p.

To compute the Hessian matrix, consider the differential two-form $(X,Y) \mapsto d_Y(d_X\Delta)$. This is the two-form whose matrix representation is the Hessian matrix. It has already been seen that $h(X,Z) = -d_X\Delta$ and that $d_Y(d_X\Delta) = -d_Y(h(X,Z)).$ What remains is

$$(X,Y) \mapsto -d_Y(h(X,Z)) = -(\nabla_Yh)(X,Z) - h(\nabla_YX,Z) - h(X,\nabla_YZ)$$.

Now assume that Δ has a singularity at p, i.e. Z = 0, then we have the two-form

$$(X,Y) \mapsto - h(X,\nabla_YZ)$$.

It also has been seen that $\nabla_XZ = (\Delta S - I)X$, and so the two-form becomes

$$(X,Y) \mapsto h(X,(I- \Delta S)Y)$$.

This is degenerate as a two-form if, and only if, there exists non-zero X for which it is zero for all Y. Since h is non-degenerate it must be that $\det(I- \Delta S) = 0$ and $Y \in \ker(I- \Delta S)$. So the singularity is degenerate if, and only if, the ambient point x lies on the affine normal line to p and the reciprocal of its distance from p is an eigenvalue of S, i.e. points $\mathbf{x} = p + t\mathbf{A}$ where 1/t is an eigenvalue of S. The affine focal set!

== Singular points ==
The affine focal set can be the following:

$$\{ p + t \mathbf{A}(p) : p \in M, \det(I - tS) = 0\} \ .$$

To find the singular points, simply differentiate p + tA in some tangent direction X:

$$D_X(p + t \mathbf{A}) = (I-tS)X + d_Xt \mathbf{A}.$$

The affine focal set is singular if, and only if, there exists non-zero X such that $D_X(p + t \mathbf{A}) = 0$, i.e. if, and only if, X is an eigenvector of S and the derivative of t in that direction is zero. This means that the derivative of an affine principal curvature in its own affine principal direction is zero.

== Local structure ==
Standard ideas can be used in singularity theory to classify, up to local diffeomorphism, the affine focal set. If the family of affine distance functions can be shown to be a certain kind of family then the local structure is known. The family of affine distance functions should be a versal unfolding of the singularities which arise.

The affine focal set of a plane curve will generically consist of smooth pieces of curve and ordinary cusp points (semi-cubical parabolae).

The affine focal set of a surface in three-space will generically consist of smooth pieces of surface, cuspidal cylinder points ($A_3$), swallowtail points ($A_4$), purse points ($D_4^+$), and pyramid points ($D_4^-$). The $A_k$ and $D_k$ series are as in Arnold's list.

The question of the local structure in much higher dimension is of great interest. For example, it is possible to construct a discrete list of singularity types (up to local diffeomorphism). In much higher dimensions, no such discrete list can be constructed, as there are functional moduli.
