= Line at infinity =

Concept in geometry and topology

In geometry and topology, the line at infinity is a projective line that is added to the affine plane in order to give closure to, and remove the exceptional cases from, the incidence properties of the resulting projective plane. The line at infinity is also called the ideal line.

== Geometric formulation ==
In projective geometry, any pair of lines always intersects at some point, but parallel lines do not intersect in the real plane. The line at infinity is added to the real plane. This completes the plane, because now parallel lines intersect at a point which lies on the line at infinity. Also, if any pair of lines do not intersect at a point on the line, then the pair of lines are parallel.

Every line intersects the line at infinity at some point. The point at which the parallel lines intersect depends only on the slope of the lines, not at all on their y-intercept.

In the affine plane, a line extends in two opposite directions. In the projective plane, the two opposite directions of a line meet each other at a point on the line at infinity. Therefore, lines in the projective plane are closed curves, i.e., they are cyclical rather than linear. This is true of the line at infinity itself; it meets itself at its two endpoints (which are therefore not actually endpoints at all) and so it is actually cyclical.

== Topological perspective ==
If we consider the real affine plane, then the line at infinity can be visualized as a circle which surrounds it. However, diametrically opposite points of the circle are equivalent—they are the same point. The combination of the real affine plane and the line at infinity makes the real projective plane, $\mathbb{R}P^2$.

A hyperbola can be seen as a closed curve which intersects the line at infinity in two different points. These two points are specified by the slopes of the two asymptotes of the hyperbola. Likewise, a parabola can be seen as a closed curve which intersects the line at infinity in a single point. This point is specified by the slope of the axis of the parabola. If the parabola is cut by its vertex into a symmetrical pair of "horns", then these two horns become more parallel to each other further away from the vertex, and are actually parallel to the axis and to each other at infinity, so that they intersect at the line at infinity.

The analogue for the complex projective plane is a 'line' at infinity that is (naturally) a complex projective line. Topologically this is quite different, in that it is a Riemann sphere, which is therefore a 2-sphere, being added to a complex affine space of two dimensions over $\mathbb{C}$ (so four real dimensions), resulting in a four-dimensional compact manifold. The result is orientable, while the real projective plane is not.

== History ==
The complex line at infinity was much used in nineteenth century geometry. In fact one of the most applied tricks was to regard a circle as a conic constrained to pass through two points at infinity, the solutions of

$$X^2 + Y^2 = 0.$$

This equation is the form taken by that of any circle when we drop terms of lower order in X and Y. More formally, we should use homogeneous coordinates

$$[X:Y:Z]$$

and note that the line at infinity is specified by setting Z = 0.

Making equations homogeneous by introducing powers of Z, and then setting Z = 0, does precisely eliminate terms of lower order.

Solving the equation, therefore, we find that all circles 'pass through' the circular points at infinity

$$I = [1:i:0], \quad J = [1:-i:0].$$

These of course are complex points, for any representing set of homogeneous coordinates. Since the projective plane has a large enough symmetry group, they are in no way special, though. The conclusion is that the three-parameter family of circles can be treated as a special case of the linear system of conics passing through two given distinct points P and Q.

== See also ==
- Elliptic geometry § Elliptic plane
- Hyperplane at infinity
- Parallel postulate
- Plane at infinity
- Point at infinity
