= Affine geometry of curves =

In the mathematical field of differential geometry, the affine geometry of curves is the study of curves in an affine space, and specifically the properties of such curves which are invariant under the special affine group $\mbox{SL}(n,\mathbb{R}) \ltimes \mathbb{R}^n.$

In the classical Euclidean geometry of curves, the fundamental tool is the Frenet–Serret frame. In affine geometry, the Frenet–Serret frame is no longer well-defined, but it is possible to define another canonical moving frame along a curve which plays a similar decisive role. The theory was developed in the early 20th century, largely from the efforts of Wilhelm Blaschke and Jean Favard.

== The affine frame ==
Let x(t) be a curve in $\mathbb{R}^n$. Assume, as one does in the Euclidean case, that the first n derivatives of x(t) are linearly independent so that, in particular, x(t) does not lie in any lower-dimensional affine subspace of $\mathbb{R}^n$. Then the curve parameter t can be normalized by setting determinant

$$\det \begin{bmatrix}\dot{\mathbf{x}}, &\ddot{\mathbf{x}}, &\dots, &{\mathbf{x}}^{(n)} \end{bmatrix} = \pm 1.$$

Such a curve is said to be parametrized by its affine arclength. For such a parameterization,

$$t\mapsto [\mathbf{x}(t),\dot{\mathbf{x}}(t),\dots,\mathbf{x}^{(n)}(t)]$$

determines a mapping into the special affine group, known as a special affine frame for the curve. That is, at each point of the quantities $\mathbf{x},\dot{\mathbf{x}},\dots,\mathbf{x}^{(n)}$ define a special affine frame for the affine space $\mathbb{R}^n$, consisting of a point x of the space and a special linear basis $\dot{\mathbf{x}},\dots,\mathbf{x}^{(n)}$ attached to the point at x. The pullback of the Maurer–Cartan form along this map gives a complete set of affine structural invariants of the curve. In the plane, this gives a single scalar invariant, the affine curvature of the curve.

== Discrete invariant ==
The normalization of the curve parameter s was selected above so that

$$\det \begin{bmatrix}\dot{\mathbf{x}}, &\ddot{\mathbf{x}}, &\dots, &{\mathbf{x}}^{(n)} \end{bmatrix} = \pm 1.$$

If n≡0 (mod 4) or n≡3 (mod 4) then the sign of this determinant is a discrete invariant of the curve. A curve is called dextrorse (right winding, frequently weinwendig in German) if it is +1, and sinistrorse (left winding, frequently hopfenwendig in German) if it is −1.

In three-dimensions, a right-handed helix is dextrorse, and a left-handed helix is sinistrorse.

== Curvature ==
Suppose that the curve x in $\mathbb{R}^n$ is parameterized by affine arclength. Then the affine curvatures, k_{1}, …, k_{n−1} of x are defined by

$$\mathbf{x}^{(n+1)} = k_1\dot{\mathbf{x}} +\cdots + k_{n-1}\mathbf{x}^{(n-1)}.$$

That such an expression is possible follows by computing the derivative of the determinant

$$0=\det \begin{bmatrix}\dot{\mathbf{x}}, &\ddot{\mathbf{x}}, &\dots, &{\mathbf{x}}^{(n)} \end{bmatrix}\dot{}\, = \det \begin{bmatrix}\dot{\mathbf{x}}, &\ddot{\mathbf{x}}, &\dots, &{\mathbf{x}}^{(n+1)} \end{bmatrix}$$

so that x^{(n+1)} is a linear combination of x′, …, x^{(n−1)}.

Consider the matrix

$$A = \begin{bmatrix}\dot{\mathbf{x}}, &\ddot{\mathbf{x}}, &\dots, &{\mathbf{x}}^{(n)} \end{bmatrix}$$

whose columns are the first n derivatives of x (still parameterized by special affine arclength). Then,

$$\dot{A} =
\begin{bmatrix}0&1&0&0&\cdots&0&0\\
0&0&1&0&\cdots&0&0\\
\vdots&\vdots&\vdots&\cdots&\cdots&\vdots&\vdots\\
0&0&0&0&\cdots&1&0\\
0&0&0&0&\cdots&0&1\\
k_1&k_2&k_3&k_4&\cdots&k_{n-1}&0
\end{bmatrix}A = CA.$$

In concrete terms, the matrix C is the pullback of the Maurer–Cartan form of the special linear group along the frame given by the first n derivatives of x.

== See also ==
- Moving frame
- Affine sphere
