= Polar hypersurface =

In algebraic geometry, given a projective algebraic hypersurface $C$ described by the homogeneous equation

$$f(x_0,x_1,x_2,\dots) = 0$$

and a point

$$a = (a_0:a_1:a_2: \cdots)$$

its polar hypersurface $P_a(C)$ is the hypersurface

$$a_0 f_0 + a_1 f_1 + a_2 f_2+\cdots = 0, \,$$

where $f_i$ are the partial derivatives of $f$.

The intersection of $C$ and $P_a(C)$ is the set of points $p$ such that the tangent at $p$ to $C$ meets $a$.
