= Louis Rousseau =

Louis Rousseau

Louis Jean Népomoucène Marie Rousseau (April 18, 1787 – September 24, 1856) was a French naval officer and veteran of the Napoleonic Wars, a utopian socialist, theorist of social Catholicism and founder of the community of Keremma.

== Life ==
=== Saint-Simonism and Fourierism ===
Louis Rousseau was born on 18 April 1787 in Angerville, a postmaster's son. He joined the navy at the age of 17 and participated in Napoléon's campaign against Britain. In December 1805 he was captured during the French campaign to Santo Domingo and spent eight years as a prisoner of war in Portsmouth. He made 22 escape attempts, all unsuccessful. He returned to France in 1814 and took part in the Hundred Days of Napoléon's return. Rousseau then returned to Angerville and became a farmer and brewer. In 1817 he married Emma Michau. His business was going badly, so in 1822 he sold it and moved to Brittany. In 1823 he founded the community of Keremma (i.e., 'Ville d’ Emma' -- City of Emma') near Tréflez. This was built on land reclaimed from the sea, and was constantly threatened by flooding. Rousseau attempted to turn Keremma into a model socialist community, inspired by the doctrines of Saint-Simonism he absorbed from the pages of the journal Le Globe, edited by Pierre Leroux. He formally joined the Saint-Simonians in 1831 and became head of the Saint-Simonian church in Brest in 1831. However, in 1832, when the Saint-Simonian school split after a quarrel between its leaders, Prosper Enfantin and Saint-Amand Bazard, Rousseau left the movement. He was exposed to the doctrines of Charles Fourier through Charles Pellarin, a naval doctor who had been a co-founder of the Saint-Simonian community at Brest, and who had converted to Fourierism. Rousseau joined the Fourierists in 1832 and attempted to reorganise Keremma on Fourierist principles, combining agriculture and manufacture. He wrote some pieces for Victor Considerant's journal Le Phalanstère.

=== Christian socialism ===
In 1834, Rousseau returned to the Catholic Church, without, however, abandoning his socialism (purified of immorality). He found his social ideas re-enforced by the gospels. He was associated with the circle of the abbot Gerbet and contributed to the journal L'Université Catholique, founded in 1836. Rousseau also produced a book expounding his social Catholicism, Croisade du dixneufième Siècle (Crusade of the Nineteenth Century). He reorganised Keremma again as a Christian agricultural community, centered on the parish. He envisioned making Keremma the nucleus of a 'Christian tribe'. To that end he founded an orphanage and a school, where children were raised in the spirit of Rousseau's Catholic socialism. Later, the school was opened to children with parents. In 1849 he founded Sainte-Enfance de Marie, a school for poor girls. It was the forerunner of the Catholic school of Marie Immaculée de Saint-Méen. While the Catholic Church was generally hostile to the Revolution of 1848, fearing a reprise of the anticlericalism of the French Revolution, Rousseau was among those who argued that Catholicism was consistent with democracy and social progress. He presented himself as a candidate to the National Assembly of the Second Republic in March, 1848, but was apparently not elected. Rousseau died in Keremma on 24 September 1856. The community of Keremma still exists and prospers, although it no longer operates as a Fourierist community. The descendants of Rousseau and Michau still live there. Rousseau is regarded as a forerunner of modern Christian socialism.

== Works ==
- 1832: 'Profession de Foi de Louis Rousseau.' Le Globe, April 19, 1832
- 1834: 'Association Catholique des Devoirs de l'Homme.' Le Phalanstère
- 1840–42: Cours d'Economie Sociale, extraits de l'Université Catholique
- 1841: Croisade du dix-neufième Siècle: Appel à l'Effet de Reconstituer la Science Sociale sur une Base Chrétienne, suivi par l'Exposition Critique des Théories Phalanstériënnes
- 1848: La Clé de la Science: Études Sociales addressées au Future Moderateur de la République Française
- 1850: 'Des Propriétés de la Ligne Droite en Politique.' L'Océan, November 30 and December 6

== Sources and links ==
- Touchard, J., Aux Origines du Catholicisme Social: Louis Rousseau, 1787–1856. Paris, 1968.
- Waché, B., 'Louis, Jean-Népomucène Rousseau (1787-1856).' Le Site de l'Association de Keremma.
- 'Louis Rousseau - Biographie' Angerville 91
- Dubos, J.C., 'Touchard, Jean: Aux Origines du Catholicisme Social: Louis Rousseau (1787-1856)' Cahiers Charles Fourier n° 10, December 1999, pp. 136–138.
- Brehon, D., 'Keremma: Un Rêve de Phalanstère' Site des Cousins de Keremma
- Pellarin, Ch., Souvenirs anecdotiques: médecine navale, saint-simonisme, chouannerie, 1868, Librairie des sciences sociales, Paris-France. Read online link
