= Monge–Ampère equation =

Nonlinear second-order partial differential equation of special kind

In mathematics, a (real) Monge–Ampère equation is a nonlinear second-order partial differential equation of special kind. A second-order equation for the unknown function $u$ of two variables $x$, $y$ is of Monge–Ampère type if it is linear in the determinant of the Hessian matrix of $u$ and in the second-order partial derivatives of $u$. The independent variables ($x$, $y$) vary over a given domain $D$ of $\R^2$. The term also applies to analogous equations with $n$ independent variables. The most complete results so far have been obtained when the equation is elliptic.

It is named after Gaspard Monge who introduced descriptive geometry and the first form of the partial differential equation in 1784, and after André-Marie Ampère who introduced the nonlinear partial differential equation in 1820 when studying the geometry of surfaces.

Luis Caffarelli earned the 2023 Abel Prize for his work on this equation.

== Definition ==
=== In two dimension ===
Given two independent variables $x$ and $y$, and one dependent variable $u$, the general Monge–Ampère equation is of the form

$$\begin{align}
L[u] =& A \det(\nabla^2 u) + B \Delta u + 2 C u_{xy} + (D-B) u_{yy} + E            \\
=& A(u_{xx} u_{yy} - u_{xy}^2) + B u_{xx} + 2 C u_{xy} + D u_{yy} + E
=  0,
\end{align}$$

where $A$, $B$, $C$, $D$, and $E$ are functions depending on the variables $x$, $y$, $u$, $u_x$, and $u_y$ only.

=== In general ===
Given a domain $\Omega \subset \R^n$ and a real-valued function $u \colon \Omega \to \R$, a (real) Monge–Ampère equation is any fully nonlinear second-order equation that can be written in the form

$$F(x,u,Du,\det D^2 u) = 0,$$

for some function $F$. More generally, $\Omega$ can be a Riemannian manifold, since $Du, D^2 u$ are well-defined on a Riemannian manifold.

If $F$ also depends linearly on all principal minors of the Hessian matrix $D^2 u$, then it is an equation of Monge–Ampère type.

=== Classification ===
As for other second-order fully nonlinear equations, the type of a Monge–Ampère equation is defined by the linearization of the operator at a sufficiently smooth solution. Of these, the most common is the elliptic case. When people say "Monge–Ampère equation" without adjective, they usually mean the elliptic case.

Let $\Omega \subset \R^n$ be an open set, $u \colon \Omega \to \R$ be a $C^2$ function, and consider an operator of Monge–Ampère type

$$L[u] = F(x,u,Du,D^2 u),$$

where $F$ is smooth in all variables and depends on $D^2 u$ only through its principal minors. The linearization of $L$ is of form

$$\sum_{ij} a^{ij}(x)\,u_{ij} + \text{lower order terms},$$

where

$$a^{ij}(x) = \frac{\partial F}{\partial u_{ij}}(x,u(x),Du(x),D^2 u(x)).$$

The quadratic form

$$Q_x(\xi) = a^{ij}(x)\,\xi_i \xi_j,\qquad \xi \in \R^n,$$

is the principal symbol of the linearized operator at the point $x$.

The equation is said to be

- elliptic at $x$ if $Q_x(\xi)$ if all eigenvalues are of the same sign,
- hyperbolic at $x$ if $Q_x(\xi)$ takes both positive and negative values (the matrix is indefinite),
- parabolic at $x$ if $Q_x(\xi)$ is degenerate (the matrix has vanishing determinant),
- degenerate elliptic if it is elliptic everywhere,
- elliptic if it is degenerate elliptic, and all eigenvalues are a bounded distance away from zero.

As follows from Jacobi's formula for the derivative of a determinant, this equation is elliptic if $f$ is a positive function and solutions satisfy the constraint of being uniformly convex. If $f$ is merely strictly convex, then the equation is degenerate-elliptic.

== Examples ==
The Monge–Ampère equation in its simplest form is

$$\det D^2 u = f(x)$$

where $f$ is a given function on a domain $\Omega \subset \R^n$. This is a special case of equation (1) below with $f(x,u,Du) = f(x)$.

The classical Liouville theorem has an analogy here. If $\det D^2 u$ is constant, and $u$ is defined on all of $\R^n$, then $u$ is a quadratic function. This is the Jörgens–Calabi–Pogorelov theorem.

If $f(x)$ is positive and uniformly convex, and $u$ is a solution to $\det D^2 u = f(x)$, then its Legendre transform $u^*$ is a solution to $\det D^2 u^* = 1/f(x)$.

=== Geometry ===
Monge–Ampère equations arise naturally in several problems in Riemannian geometry, conformal geometry, affine geometry, and CR geometry.

Given a twice-differentiable real-valued function $f: \Omega \to \R$ defined over a domain $\Omega \subset \R^n$, its graph is a manifold of n dimensions. At any $x \in \Omega$, the Gaussian curvature of the manifold at $f(x)$ is $\frac{\det D^2 u}{(1 + |Du|^2)^{(n+2)/2}}$. Thus, if we want to find a manifold whose Gaussian curvature is an arbitrary function we pick ourselves, then we need to solve the following Monge–Ampère equation:

$$\det D^2 u - K(x)(1 + |Du|^2)^{(n+2)/2} = 0$$

where $K$ is the Gaussian curvature we want. Given such a function K, it is nontrivial to find a solution, if any. The problem of finding a solution is the Minkowski problem, or the prescribed Gaussian curvature problem.

For example, the rigidity of the 2-sphere manifests as the fact that if we require $n = 3, K = 1, u(0) = 0, Du = 0$, then there are just two unique solutions, which is the unit 2-sphere and its reflection.

The affine spheres can be characterized by a Monge–Ampère equation.

=== Optimal transport ===
Consider the problem of optimal transport with quadratic cost (this is also called the 2-Wasserstein metric problem) on $\R^n$. That is, suppose $\mu, \nu$ are distributions on $\R^n$ with probability density functions $\rho_\mu, \rho_\nu$. In this case, a map $T : \operatorname{supp}(\mu) \to \operatorname{supp}(\nu)$ is a transport map iff it satisfies
$$\int h(T(x)) \rho_\mu(x) dx = \int h(y) \rho_\nu(y) dy$$
for any integrable test function $h \in L^1(\operatorname{supp}(\nu))$. The problem is to find the $T$ that minimizes the following quadratic cost function:
$$\min_T \int \|x - T(x) \|^2 f(x) dx$$
By a theorem of Brenier, the optimal transport map exists, and is the gradient of a convex function $\psi: \operatorname{supp}(\mu) \to \R^n$, with $T = D \psi$. The convex function satisfies a Monge–Ampère equation:
$$\begin{cases}
\det(D^2 \psi) = \frac{\rho_\mu}{\rho_\nu \circ D \psi}\\
D \psi(\partial\operatorname{supp}(\mu)) = \partial \operatorname{supp}(\nu)
\end{cases}$$
The boundary condition simply states that the optimal transport maps the boundary of the source to the boundary of the target. Furthermore, the solution $\psi$ is almost everywhere unique.

The function $\psi$ is called the potential function of the problem in this case.

Conversely, some Monge–Ampère equations can be interpreted optimal transport. Weak-solutions of a Monge–Ampère equations obtained by optimal transport are often called Brenier solutions in the literature. Brenier solutions satisfy their corresponding Monge–Ampère equations almost everywhere.

== Rellich's theorem ==
Let $\Omega$ be a bounded domain in $\R^3$, and suppose that on $\Omega$ the coefficients $A$, $B$, $C$, $D$, and $E$ are continuous functions of $x$ and $y$ only. Consider the Dirichlet problem to find $u$ so that

$$L[u]=0,\quad \text{on}\ \Omega$$
$$u|_{\partial\Omega}=g.$$

If

$$BD-C^2-AE > 0,$$

then the Dirichlet problem has at most two solutions.

== Ellipticity results ==
Suppose now that $\mathbf{x}$ is a variable with values in a domain in $\R^n$, and that $f(\mathbf{x},u,Du)$ is a positive function. Then the Monge–Ampère equation

$$L[u] = \det D^2 u - f(\mathbf{x},u,Du)=0\qquad\qquad (1)$$

is a nonlinear elliptic partial differential equation (in the sense that its linearization is elliptic), provided one confines attention to convex solutions.

Accordingly, the operator $L$ satisfies versions of the maximum principle, and in particular solutions to the Dirichlet problem are unique, provided they exist.

== See also ==
- List of nonlinear partial differential equations
- Complex Monge–Ampère equation

== Additional references ==
- Aubin, Thierry (1998). Some nonlinear problems in Riemannian geometry. Springer Monographs in Mathematics. Berlin: Springer-Verlag. doi:10.1007/978-3-662-13006-3. ISBN 3-540-60752-8. MR 1636569. Zbl 0896.53003.
- Courant, R.; Hilbert, D. (1962). Methods of mathematical physics. Volume II: Partial differential equations. New York–London: Interscience Publishers. doi:10.1002/9783527617234. ISBN 9780471504399. MR 0140802. Zbl 0099.29504.
- Gilbarg, David; Trudinger, Neil S. (2001). Elliptic partial differential equations of second order. Classics in Mathematics (Reprint of the 1998 ed.). Berlin: Springer-Verlag. doi:10.1007/978-3-642-61798-0. ISBN 3-540-41160-7. MR 1814364. Zbl 1042.35002.
- Spivak, Michael (1999). A comprehensive introduction to differential geometry: volume five (Third edition of 1975 original ed.). Publish or Perish, Inc. ISBN 0-914098-74-8. MR 0532834. Zbl 1213.53001.
- Villani, Cédric (2003). Topics in optimal transportation. Graduate Studies in Mathematics. Vol. 58. Providence, RI: American Mathematical Society. doi:10.1090/gsm/058. ISBN 0-8218-3312-X. MR 1964483. Zbl 1106.90001.
- Villani, Cédric (2009). Optimal transport. Old and new. Grundlehren der mathematischen Wissenschaften. Vol. 338. Berlin: Springer-Verlag. doi:10.1007/978-3-540-71050-9. ISBN 978-3-540-71049-3. MR 2459454. Zbl 1156.53003.
- Figalli, Alessio (2017). The Monge-Ampère equation and its applications. Zurich lectures in advanced mathematics. Zürich: European Mathematical Society. ISBN 978-3-03719-170-5.
- Gutiérrez, Cristian E. (2016). The Monge-Ampère Equation. Progress in Nonlinear Differential Equations and Their Applications (2nd ed. 2016 ed.). Cham: Birkhäuser. ISBN 978-3-319-43372-1.
- Lê, Nam Q. (2024). Analysis of Monge-Ampère equations. Graduate studies in mathematics. Providence, Rhode Island: American Mathematical Society. ISBN 978-1-4704-7420-1.
