= Affine curvature =

Special affine curvature, also known as the equiaffine curvature or affine curvature, is a particular type of curvature that is defined on a plane curve that remains unchanged under a special affine transformation (an affine transformation that preserves area). The curves of constant equiaffine curvature k are precisely all non-singular plane conics. Those with k > 0 are ellipses, those with k = 0 are parabolae, and those with k < 0 are hyperbolae.

The usual Euclidean curvature of a curve at a point is the curvature of its osculating circle, the unique circle making second order contact (having three point contact) with the curve at the point. In the same way, the special affine curvature of a curve at a point P is the special affine curvature of its hyperosculating conic, which is the unique conic making fourth order contact (having five point contact) with the curve at P. In other words, it is the limiting position of the (unique) conic through P and four points P_{1}, P_{2}, P_{3}, P_{4} on the curve, as each of the points approaches P:

$$P_1,P_2,P_3,P_4\to P.$$

In some contexts, the affine curvature refers to a differential invariant κ of the general affine group, which may readily obtained from the special affine curvature k by κ = k^{−3/2}dk/ds, where s is the special affine arc length. Where the general affine group is not used, the special affine curvature k is sometimes also called the affine curvature.

== Formal definition ==
=== Special affine arclength ===
To define the special affine curvature, it is necessary first to define the special affine arclength (also called the equiaffine arclength). Consider an affine plane curve β(t). Choose coordinates for the affine plane such that the area of the parallelogram spanned by two vectors a = (a_{1}, a_{2}) and b = (b_{1}, b_{2}) is given by the determinant

$$\det\begin{bmatrix}a & b\end{bmatrix} = a_{1} b_{2} - a_{2} b_{1}.$$

In particular, the determinant

$$\det\begin{bmatrix}\dfrac{d\beta}{dt} & \dfrac{d^2\beta}{dt^2}\end{bmatrix}$$

is a well-defined invariant of the special affine group, and gives the signed area of the parallelogram spanned by the velocity and acceleration of the curve β. Consider a reparameterization of the curve β, say with a new parameter s related to t by means of a regular reparameterization s = s(t). This determinant undergoes then a transformation of the following sort, by the chain rule:

$$\begin{align}
\det\begin{bmatrix}\dfrac{d\beta}{dt} & \dfrac{d^2\beta}{dt^2}\end{bmatrix} &= \det\begin{bmatrix}\dfrac{d\beta}{ds}\dfrac{ds}{dt} & \left(\dfrac{d^2\beta}{ds^2}\left(\dfrac{ds}{dt}\right)^2+\dfrac{d\beta}{ds}\dfrac{d^2s}{dt^2}\right)\end{bmatrix}\\
&=\left(\frac{ds}{dt}\right)^3\det\begin{bmatrix}\dfrac{d\beta}{ds} & \dfrac{d^2\beta}{ds^2}\end{bmatrix}.
\end{align}$$

The reparameterization can be chosen so that

$$\det\begin{bmatrix}\dfrac{d\beta}{ds} & \dfrac{d^2\beta}{ds^2}\end{bmatrix} = 1$$

provided the velocity and acceleration, dβ/dt and d^{2}β/dt^{2} are linearly independent. Existence and uniqueness of such a parameterization follows by integration:

$$s(t) = \int_a^t\sqrt[3]{\det\begin{bmatrix}\dfrac{d\beta}{dt} & \dfrac{d^2\beta}{dt^2}\end{bmatrix}}\,\,dt.$$

This integral is called the special affine arclength, and a curve carrying this parameterization is said to be parameterized with respect to its special affine arclength.

=== Special affine curvature ===
Suppose that β(s) is a curve parameterized with its special affine arclength. Then the special affine curvature (or equiaffine curvature) is given by

$$k(s) = \det\begin{bmatrix}\beta''(s) & \beta'''(s) \end{bmatrix}.$$

Here β′ denotes the derivative of β with respect to s.

More generally, for a plane curve with arbitrary parameterization

$$t \mapsto \bigl(x(t), y(t)\bigr),$$

the special affine curvature is:

$$\begin{align}
k(t)&=\frac{x''y'''-x'''y''}{\left(x'y''-x''y'\right)^\frac53}-\frac12\left(\frac{1}{\left(x'y''-x''y'\right)^\frac23}\right)''\\[6px]
&= \frac{4\left(x''y'''-x'''y''\right)+\left(x'y''''-x''''y'\right)}{3\left(x'y''-x''y'\right)^\frac53} - \frac{5\left(x'y'''-x'''y'\right)^2}{9\left(x'y''-x''y'\right)^\frac83}
\end{align}$$

provided the first and second derivatives of the curve are linearly independent. In the special case of a graph y = y(x), these formulas reduce to

$$k=-\frac12\left(\frac{1}{\left(y''\right)^\frac23}\right)''=\frac{y''''}{3\left(y''\right)^\frac53}-\frac{5\left(y'''\right)^2}{9\left(y''\right)^\frac83}$$

where the prime denotes differentiation with respect to x.

=== Affine curvature ===
Suppose as above that β(s) is a curve parameterized by special affine arclength. There are a pair of invariants of the curve that are invariant under the full general affine group — the group of all affine motions of the plane, not just those that are area-preserving. The first of these is

$$\sigma = \int \sqrt{k(s)}\, ds,$$

sometimes called the affine arclength (although this risks confusion with the special affine arclength described above). The second is referred to as the affine curvature:

$$\kappa = k^{-\frac32} \frac{dk}{ds}.$$

== Conics ==
Suppose that β(s) is a curve parameterized by special affine arclength with constant affine curvature k. Let

$$C_\beta(s) = \begin{bmatrix}\beta'(s) & \beta''(s)\end{bmatrix}.$$

Note that det(C_{β}) = 1 since β is assumed to carry the special affine arclength parameterization, and that

$$k = \det\left(C_\beta'\right).\,$$

It follows from the form of C_{β} that

$$C_\beta' = C_\beta\begin{bmatrix}0&-k\\1&0\end{bmatrix}.$$

By applying a suitable special affine transformation, we can arrange that C_{β}(0) = I is the identity matrix. Since k is constant, it follows that C_{β} is given by the matrix exponential

$$\begin{align}
C_\beta(s) &= \exp\left\{s\cdot\begin{bmatrix}0&-k\\1&0\end{bmatrix}\right\}\\
&=\begin{bmatrix}\cos\sqrt{k}\,s&\sqrt{k}\sin\sqrt{k}\,s\\ -\frac{1}{\sqrt{k}}\sin\sqrt{k}\,s&\cos\sqrt{k}\,s\end{bmatrix}.
\end{align}$$

The three cases are now as follows.

k = 0

If the curvature vanishes identically, then upon passing to a limit,

$$C_\beta(s) = \begin{bmatrix}1&0\\s&1\end{bmatrix}$$

so β′(s) = (1, s), and so integration gives

$$\beta(s)=\left(s,\frac{s^2}{2}\right)\,$$

up to an overall constant translation, which is the special affine parameterization of the parabola y = x^{2}/2.

k > 0

If the special affine curvature is positive, then it follows that

$$\beta'(s) = \left(\cos\sqrt{k}\,s,\frac{1}{\sqrt{k}}\sin\sqrt{k}\,s\right)$$

so that

$$\beta(s) = \left(\frac{1}{\sqrt{k}}\sin\sqrt{k}\,s, -\frac{1}{k}\cos\sqrt{k}\,s\right)$$

up to a translation, which is the special affine parameterization of the ellipse kx^{2} + k^{2}y^{2} = 1.

k < 0

If k is negative, then the trigonometric functions in C_{β} give way to hyperbolic functions:

$$C_\beta(s) =\begin{bmatrix}\cosh\sqrt{|k|}\,s & \sqrt{|k|}\sinh\sqrt{|k|}\,s \\ \frac{1}{\sqrt{|k|}}\sinh\sqrt{|k|}\,s & \cosh\sqrt{|k|}\,s\end{bmatrix}.$$

Thus

$$\beta(s) = \left(\frac{1}{\sqrt{|k|}}\sinh\sqrt{|k|}\,s,\frac{1}{|k|}\cosh\sqrt{|k|}\,s\right)$$

up to a translation, which is the special affine parameterization of the hyperbola

$$-|k|x^2 + |k|^2y^2 = 1.$$

== Characterization up to affine congruence ==
The special affine curvature of an immersed curve is the only (local) invariant of the curve in the following sense:

- If two curves have the same special affine curvature at every point, then one curve is obtained from the other by means of a special affine transformation.

In fact, a slightly stronger statement holds:

- Given any continuous function k : [a, b] → R, there exists a curve β whose first and second derivatives are linearly independent, such that the special affine curvature of β relative to the special affine parameterization is equal to the given function k. The curve β is uniquely determined up to a special affine transformation.

This is analogous to the fundamental theorem of curves in the classical Euclidean differential geometry of curves, in which the complete classification of plane curves up to Euclidean motion depends on a single function κ, the curvature of the curve. It follows essentially by applying the Picard–Lindelöf theorem to the system

$$C_\beta' = C_\beta\begin{bmatrix}0&-k\\1&0\end{bmatrix}$$

where C_{β} = [β′ β″]. An alternative approach, rooted in the theory of moving frames, is to apply the existence of a primitive for the Darboux derivative.

== Derivation of the curvature by affine invariance ==
The special affine curvature can be derived explicitly by techniques of invariant theory. For simplicity, suppose that an affine plane curve is given in the form of a graph y = y(x). The special affine group acts on the Cartesian plane via transformations of the form

$$\begin{align}
x&\mapsto ax+by + \alpha\\
y&\mapsto cx+dy + \beta,
\end{align}$$

with ad − bc = 1. The following vector fields span the Lie algebra of infinitesimal generators of the special affine group:

$$\begin{align}
T_1 &= \partial_x, & \quad T_2 &= \partial_y \\
X_1 &= x\partial_y, & \quad X_2 &= y\partial_x, & H &= x\partial_x - y\partial_y.
\end{align}$$

An affine transformation not only acts on points, but also on the tangent lines to graphs of the form y = y(x). That is, there is an action of the special affine group on triples of coordinates (x, y, y′). The group action is generated by vector fields

$$T_1^{(1)},T_2^{(1)},X_1^{(1)},X_2^{(1)},H^{(1)}$$

defined on the space of three variables (x, y, y′). These vector fields can be determined by the following two requirements:

- Under the projection onto the xy-plane, they must to project to the corresponding original generators of the action T_{1}, T_{2}, X_{1}, X_{2}, H, respectively.
- The vectors must preserve up to scale the contact structure of the jet space

$$\theta_1 = dy - y'\,dx.$$

Concretely, this means that the generators X^{(1)} must satisfy

$$L_{X^{(1)}}\theta_1 \equiv 0 \pmod{\theta_1}$$

where L is the Lie derivative.

Similarly, the action of the group can be extended to the space of any number of derivatives (x, y, y′, y″,…, y^{(k)}).

The prolonged vector fields generating the action of the special affine group must then inductively satisfy, for each generator X ∈ {T_{1}, T_{2}, X_{1}, X_{2}, H}:

- The projection of X^{(k)} onto the space of variables (x, y, y′,…, y^{(k−1)}) is X^{(k−1)}.
- X^{(k)} preserves the contact ideal:

$$L_{X^{(k)}}\theta_k \equiv 0 \pmod{\theta_1,\dots, \theta_k}$$

where

$$\theta_i = dy^{(i-1)} - y^{(i)}dx.$$

Carrying out the inductive construction up to order 4 gives

$$\begin{align}
T_1^{(4)} &= \partial_x, \qquad T_2^{(4)} = \partial_y \\
X_1^{(4)} &= x\partial_y + \partial_{y'} \\
X_2^{(4)} &= y\partial_x-y'^2\partial_{y'}-3y'y''\partial_{y''}-\left(3y''^2+4y'y'''\right)\partial_{y'''}-\bigl(10y''y'''+5y'y''''\bigr)\partial_{y''''} \\
H^{(4)} &= x\partial_x - y\partial_y - 2y'\partial_{y'} - 3y''\partial_{y''}-4y'''\partial_{y'''}-5y''''\partial_{y''''}.
\end{align}$$

The special affine curvature

$$k=\frac{y''''}{3\left(y''\right)^\frac53}-\frac{5\left(y'''\right)^2}{9\left(y''\right)^\frac83}$$

does not depend explicitly on x, y, or y′, and so satisfies

$$T_1^{(4)}k=T_2^{(4)}k=X_1^{(4)}k=0.$$

The vector field H acts diagonally as a modified homogeneity operator, and it is readily verified that H^{(4)}k = 0. Finally,

$$X_2^{(4)}k = \tfrac12\left[H,X_1\right]^{(4)}k = \tfrac12\left[H^{(4)},X_1^{(4)}\right]k = 0.$$

The five vector fields

$$T_1^{(4)},T_2^{(4)},X_1^{(4)},X_2^{(4)},H^{(4)}$$

form an involutive distribution on (an open subset of) R^{6} so that, by the Frobenius integration theorem, they integrate locally to give a foliation of R^{6} by five-dimensional leaves. Concretely, each leaf is a local orbit of the special affine group. The function k parameterizes these leaves.

== Human motor system ==
Human curvilinear 2-dimensional drawing movements tend to follow the equiaffine parametrization. This is more commonly known as the two thirds power law, according to which the hand's speed is proportional to the Euclidean curvature raised to the minus third power. Namely,

$$v = \gamma \kappa^{-\frac13},$$

where v is the speed of the hand, κ is the Euclidean curvature and γ is a constant termed the velocity gain factor.

== See also ==
- Affine geometry of curves
- Affine sphere
