= Jules Lechevalier =

French utopian socialist, economist and anthropologist

Jules André Louis Lechevalier (21 April 1806 – 10 June 1862) was a French utopian socialist, economist and anthropologist. He was at first a Saint-Simonian, then a Fourierist and a collaborator of Proudhon. After 1855 he was also known as Jules Lechevalier Saint-André. His years of birth and death are sometimes given as 1800 and 1850, respectively, but this is incorrect.

== Early life ==
Jules André Louis Lechevalier was born on 21 April 1806, in Saint-Pierre-le-Mouillage, Martinique, in the French Antilles. His father was a wealthy merchant originally from Bordeaux; his mother was Creole. In the 1820s he came to Paris to study at the École Polytechnique in Paris. He studied philosophy under Victor Cousin and was influenced by the philosophy of Hegel. The Polytechnique was then a hotbed of utopian socialism. Auguste Comte, Prosper Enfantin, Olinde Rodrigues, Michel Chevalier and other disciples of Henri de Saint-Simon were all Polytechniciens, as was Victor Considerant, the Fourierist. Lechevalier joined the Saint-Simonians in 1826 and was a very effective propagandist on their behalf. Reportedly it was Lechevalier's relationship with an actress, frowned upon by some of the Saint-Simonians but endorsed by Enfantin, which prompted Enfantin to proclaim the doctrine of free love. In 1830 he welcomed the July Revolution, although it was not yet in his opinion a real social revolution; he hoped that the new constitutional monarchy of Louis Philippe might be more receptive to social reform than the Restoration absolutism of Charles X. However, in 1832, the Saint-Simonian school split, due to a conflict between the Saint-Simonian leaders Prosper Enfantin and Saint-Armand Bazard. Lechevalier left the Saint-Simonians and shortly afterward joined the disciples of Charles Fourier. Together with Victor Considerant, he founded the journal Le Phalanstère. Later, he founded his own journal, La revue du progrès social.

== Anthropological work and Revolution ==
In 1838–1839 he returned to the Antilles on behalf of the French Ministry of the Marine and the Colonies and carried out a study on the status of slavery in the French colonies. He became an advocate of the abolition of slavery, advancing plans for slave emancipation that invoked the Fourierist idea of association, although some historians have seen his activities as overly conciliatory to the colonial planters' interests. Lechevalier also explored the prospects of setting up model Fourierist settlements, or phalansteries, in the French colonies (such as French Guiana) and in the United States. Back in France, he was active in the co-operative movement and the early trade union movement. In 1848, he supported the February Revolution and the creation of the Second French Republic and was very active in the republican club led by Armand Barbès. He collaborated with the republican socialists, or "social democrats" as they were beginning to call themselves, such as Louis Blanc and Pierre Leroux. He also contributed to various journals, including La Tribune des Peuples edited by the Polish poet and nationalist Adam Mickiewicz.

In 1848–1849 he collaborated with the anarchist Pierre-Joseph Proudhon in setting up a "People's Bank" based on mutualist principles. He also contributed to Proudhon's Le Représentant du Peuple. Around this time he began to distance himself somewhat from orthodox Fourierism. The Fourierists had always insisted that they did not want to abolish private property, but merely to organise it. Under Proudhon's influence, Lechevalier seems to have contemplated replacing the absolute right of property with a conditional right of usufructure. Going even further than Proudhon, who opposed communism (i.e., collectivisation of property), Lechevalier declared: "Socialism is communism in transition; communism is its logical and necessary end." For this he was given a citation by the police.

== Exile and return ==
In 1849 Lechevalier opposed the election of Louis Bonaparte to the presidency and participated in an anti-Bonapartist demonstration on 13 June, organised by Considerant. The uprising was put down, and Lechevalier went into hiding, escaping to Britain. After the coup of 2 December 1852, Bonaparte proclaimed himself Napoléon III and founded the Second Empire. In Britain, Lechevalier participated in the co-operative and trade union movements and wrote a book about the prospects of co-operative communities there. He was also involved in setting up consumers' association. Lechevalier at first worked with the Christian socialists, Frederick Denison Maurice, Charles Kingsley and John Malcolm Ludlow (whom he had known for years). After quarrelling with Ludlow, Lechevalier worked with the British trade unionist and secularist George Jacob Holyoake. In the late 1850s, the Second Empire became more liberal. At bottom, Lechevalier had always regarded politics as secondary to social organisation; as he had hoped for social reform from the constitutional monarchy of Louis Philippe, so, in later years, he came to hope for social reform from the Bonapartist empire. He began to write favourable articles about the Second Empire. In return, the French government exercised a certain leniency: he was allowed to travel to France several times without being arrested, and was eventually allowed to return to France permanently. For a while he worked in the French government's statistical office. Some of his fellow republicans thought ill of him for this; Holyoake even accused him of being a Bonapartist police spy, but this was not true. On his return he rekindled his connections with the Saint-Simonians. His various co-operative projects, his voyages and his spell of exile had decimated his fortune, and he spent his later years in financial difficulty. He died of an aneurysm in Paris on 10 June 1862.

Lechevalier wrote extensively on sociological, economic, anthropological and political topics. Long a forgotten figure of nineteenth century socialism, he has recently attracted some scholarly interest. He has been credited with being a forerunner of the French welfare system, a pioneer of international development theory and of community microeconomics. He also wrote extensively on finance and the organisation of credit and promoted such ideas as the chequing account.

"Il y a toute la lucidité d'un Max Havelaar dans l'analyse du colonialisme dont Jules Lechevalier est par naissance l'enfant prodigue." (There is all the lucidity of a Max Havelaar in Jules Lechevalier's analysis of colonialism, of which he is by birth the prodigal son.) -- Jean-Philippe Brun, 'Jules Lechevalier (1806-1862).'

== Works ==
- Aux Saint-Simoniens: Lettre sur la Division survenue dans l'Association Saint-Simonienne. Paris, 1831.
- Études sur la Science Sociale. Paris, 1834.
- Note sur la Fondation d'une Nouvelle Colonie dans la Guyane Française. Paris, 1844.
- De l'Avenir de la Monarchie Représentative en France. Paris, 1845.
- Five Years In The Land Of Refuge: A Letter on the Prospects of Cooperative Associations in England. London, 1854.
