= Hippolyte Renaud =

French artillery officer, utopian socialist and journalist (1803 - 1874)

Hippolyte Renaud.

Claude Hélène Hippolyte Renaud (May 26, 1803–December 29, 1874) was a French artillery officer, utopian socialist and journalist.

== Life and views ==
=== Early years ===
Hippolyte Renaud was born on 26 May 1803 in Besançon in southern France, the son of a lawyer. He studied at the École Polytechnique (1823–25) and at the Artillery School in Metz (starting in the fall of 1825). The École Polytechnique was a hotbed of utopian socialism in the 1820s. The ideas of Henri de Saint-Simon and Charles Fourier were especially popular. Among Renaud's teachers at the Polytechnique was the mathematician François Arago, whose course on 'Social Arithmetic' (dealing with statistics and probability) Renaud took in the summer of 1825 and transcribed; the transcript is published by the Bibliothèque de l'École Polytechnique. There is some indication that Renaud was involved in the Saint-Simonian movement before becoming a Fourierist. As late as 1831 he wrote to Michel Chevalier (then a leading Saint-Simonian): "To begin with, your theory of history struck me and penetrated me with admiration," and requested that Chevalier continue to send him his newspaper.

=== Fourierism ===
Renaud was converted to Fourierism in 1828, by his fellow artillery officer in Metz, Victor Considerant. He contributed to such Fourierist journals as Le Phalanstère and La Démocratie Pacifique, edited by Considerant. Like Renaud, Considerant had graduated from the Polytechnique and from the Artillery School in Metz. Renaud also wrote a popular exposition of Fourier's theory, Solidarité: Vue Synthétique sur la Doctrine de Ch. Fourier (Solidarity: A Synthetic View of the Doctrine of Charles Fourier). First published in Paris in 1842, it went through many editions and was translated into a number of languages. Renaud's book systematised the vast and sometimes contradictory writings of Fourier and sanitised his doctrines somewhat, passing over some of the more fantastical ideas. It was widely read not only in France but abroad; among others, it influenced Renaud's fellow Besançonian, the anarchist Pierre-Joseph Proudhon, the Young Hegelian 'true socialists' Karl Grün and Moses Hess and the British utilitarian John Stuart Mill.

== Social theory ==
=== Solidarity and property ===
In Solidarité, Renaud criticizes modern civilization for its 'simplism' -- its tendency to treat problems in isolation rather than as interconnected, and to follow one principle to the exclusion of other, corrective principles. The ills of the modern system of property, for example, are due to a 'simplistic' conception of ownership as absolute: an absolute right of property leads to exploitation and oppression; however, property does not have to be abolished, but merely corrected by principles of association and the 'distribution of benefits'. Because those who defend the rights of capital and those who defend the rights of labour adopt a 'simplistic' view, they come into violent conflict, but violence in the long run never produces a stable and harmonious social order. Property derives its legitimacy from labour: we have a right to ownership of that with which we have mixed our labour. Natural resources, untouched by human labour, such as land, cannot legitimately be appropriated, however, but can be claimed as instruments of labour by any. The 'societarian' theory of Fourier is designed to recognise, reconcile and organise both of these rights in a harmonious equilibrium. Renaud rejected various rival socialist conceptions such as communism (the collectivisation of property) and egalitarianism (the strictly equal distribution of goods), and proposed to apportion the rewards of industry according to talent, capital and labour. Renaud advocated what he called 'organic solidarity'. The concept of solidarity had a storied history after Renaud, appropriated at times not only by socialists but also by social theorists of French political Catholicism and theorists of the nationalist right.

In the early 1840s, Renaud carried on a debate on property with Proudhon and the liberal economist Jérôme-Adolphe Blanqui. Proudhon's book, Qu'est-ce que la Propriété?, published in 1840, declared: "Property is theft!" but his later, mutualist conception of a limited right of property (essentially possession for usufruct) owed much to Renaud, down to the terminology. Adolphe Blanqui was the brother of the famous imprisoned revolutionary Louis Auguste Blanqui. Unlike his brother, who professed to be a communist, Adolphe Blanqui defended classical liberal free market economics. Renaud defended the rights of labour against 'absolute property' and refused to recognise a right of property stemming from first occupation. He distinguished the Fourierist conception of property from communism and egalitarianism (which he claims is Proudhon's theory), and devoted much attention to refuting Proudhon's criticisms of Fourierism. He claimed that Proudhon had not understood Fourier at all.

== Metaphysical views ==
=== Metempsychosis ===
In addition to his political writings, Renaud also delved into metaphysics. Like many of his contemporaries, he was greatly influenced by romanticism, German speculative idealism, Neo-Pythagorean and Neo-Platonic mysticism and the recently translated classics of Hindu and Buddhist philosophy. Renaud defended the doctrine of metempsychosis, sought a metaphysical holism that would transcend the traditional dualisms of materialism and spiritualism, realism and idealism, and proffered an interpretation of Christianity which, though at odds with Catholic orthodoxy, was in his opinion closer to the teachings of Jesus and the apostles. His theory of the transmigration of souls is expounded in Destinée de l'Homme dans les Deux Mondes, published in 1862 together with a similar tract, Etude sur la Seconde Vie, by Dr. Jaenger.

=== Materialism and evolution ===
In Le Matérialisme et la Nature (Paris, 1870), he criticised the mechanistic materialism of the eighteenth century and of the popular contemporary materialist Ludwig Büchner and argues for an integral, truly 'scientific' materialism. Science, he assures us, recognises the existence of the ether, the medium of what we call spirit. Unlike the mechanistic materialists, Renaud rejects determinism and defends free will, which is itself a force of nature. Renaud also discusses Charles Darwin's theory of evolution by natural selection. Renaud the theory of evolution in principle; he denies that it degrades man to suppose that he is descended from the ape. However, humans are unique and incomparable in that they can comprehend and modify the laws of nature. Renaud also confidently asserts that evolution gradually eliminates 'inferior races': when human races come into contact, even if their relations are peaceful, the weaker eventually disappears. This sort of naïve racist talk of inferior races was quite common at the time, but Renaud was not actually trying to defend racial privileges: like most utopian socialists he opposed slavery and forward to a harmonious world of universal happiness. Renaud also refused to deploy the theory of evolution in the way many contemporary social Darwinists did, e.g., to justify laissez-faire economics and 'survival of the fittest' in the free market, or to justify war between nations as an eternal and natural 'struggle for existence'. On the contrary, Renaud asserts that evolution gradually refines human moral sensibilities and increases human solidarity, while war, one of the greatest evils of civilization, will give way to universal peace as the social order is perfected. The book also contains some speculations and mathematical reflections on gravity.

== Subsequent career ==
=== Military ===
After his training at the Artillery School in Metz, Renaud pursued a career in the French army. He became an officer, was promoted to chef d'escadron (squadron leader) in 1851, and to lieutenant-colonel in 1860. He served as sub-inspector of forges in Metz. He retired in 1861 and subsequently worked as an engineer. In spite of his military career, Renaud viewed war as an evil resulting from the inadequate social organisation of 'civilization' and looked forward to its disappearance under socialism. Renaud was made an officer of the French Legion of Honour.

=== Politics ===
Like Fourier and most of his followers, Renaud regarded political forms as secondary to socio-economic organisation. Nevertheless, he welcomed the establishment of the Second Republic in 1848, seeing the republic as the political form most compatible with Fourierist principles. He did not play a prominent role in the political events of the revolutionary period of 1848-49, but he was a prominent publicist, promoting his doctrine of 'organic solidarity' in his journalism, books and speeches. The rise of Louis Bonaparte resulted in the imprisonment or exile of many of Renaud's fellow socialists. However, Renaud remained at liberty in France and even achieved distinction in his military career, perhaps because of his peripheral political involvement. He remained faithful to his reformist principles until the end, deploring both the revolutionary violence of the Paris Commune of 1871 and the violence with which the Communards were suppressed. Apparently he died at Epinal on 6 January 1874, though some sources say 1873.

== Works ==
- 1832(?): Les Enfants au Phalanstère.
- 1840: 'Qu'est-ce que la Propriété? Lettre au Rédacteur de L'Impartial.' La Phalange. October 14, 1840. p. 408-409.
- 1845: Quinze Millions à Gagner sur les Bords de la Crise: Mémoire présenté à la Société d'Agriculture d'Indre et Loire.
- 1842: Solidarité: Vue Synthétique sur la Doctrine de Charles Fourier.
- 1862: Destinée de l'Homme dans les Deux Mondes [suivi de] Etude sur la Seconde Vie par le Dr Jaenger de Colmar.
- 1870: Le Matérialisme et la Nature.

== Sources ==
- Kool, F., Dokumente der Weltrevolution. Vol. 1: Die frühen Sozialisten. Freiburg i.B., 1967.
- Vernus, Michel (December 2000). "Un imprimeur bisontin au service des fouriéristes : Louis de Saint-Agathe" (in French). Cahiers Charles Fourier. pp. 67–80.
- Régnier, Ph., 'Renaud, Claude Hélène Hipplyte.' Les Polytechniciens. Société des Études saint-simoniennes. Online at: http://lire.ish-lyon.cnrs.fr/ESS/listeB/renaud.pdf.
