= Charles Pellarin =

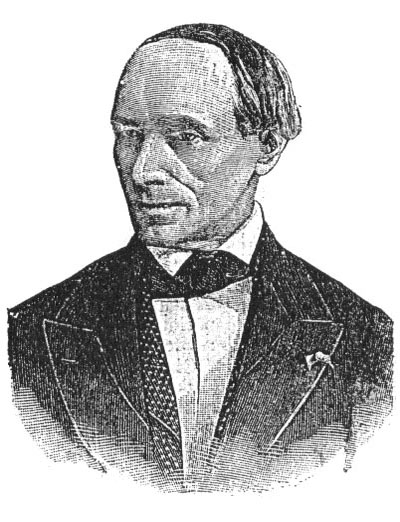
Dr. Charles Pellarin.

Charles Pellarin (November 25, 1804 – December 13, 1883) was a French naval doctor, utopian socialist, sociologist, anthropologist and journalist. He was the first biographer of Charles Fourier.

== Early life ==
=== Saint-Simonism ===
Esprit Charles Pellarin was born in Jugon on 25 November 1804. His father was a policeman; his mother was from the aristocratic Rogon family. Charles was educated at the Brest School of Naval Medicine and at the Parisian École Polytechnique, which was a hotbed of utopian socialism in the 1820s. Many future disciples of Henri de Saint-Simon and Charles Fourier went there. Pellarin considered himself a Voltairian, free-thinker and deist, and seems to have been involved with the French Carbonari in his youth. He at first joined the Saint-Simonians, led by Prosper Enfantin and Saint-Amand Bazard. Pellarin and Louis Rousseau founded a Saint-Simonian community at Brest. In 1827-30 he was involved in several military campaigns as a naval surgeon. He welcomed the July Revolution of 1830 with cautious optimism as a "new stage in the Revolution", but considered political forms secondary to socio-economic organisation. Pellarin turned his inheritance from the Rogon family over to the Saint-Simonians. In 1832 he was briefly a member of the Saint-Simonian commune in Ménilmontant. That year, Enfantin and Bazard quarrelled over the direction of the school—Enfantin emphasised the religious, mystical aspects, Bazard was more interested in practical politics. Enfantin's prescriptions for his followers were becoming more eccentric; Pellarin thought he detected mental illness. Pellarin himself seems to have subject to emotional as well as financial distress at the time; having resigned his naval commission and disposed of much of his inheritance, he is said to have been unemployed and temporarily suicidal.

=== Fourierism ===
After leaving the Saint-Simonian school, Pellarin joined the Fourierists, with whom he had been acquainted for some time. He contributed to several Fourierist journals, including La Réforme Industrielle, Le Phalanstère and La Démocratie Pacifique, edited by Victor Considerant. After Fourier died in 1837, Pellarin wrote a biography of him, together with an exposition of his social doctrines. It was first published in 1843 and went through many editions, being translated into English in 1849. It remained the standard biography of Fourier until the 1980s. Like most of Fourier's disciples, Pellarin took pains to emphasise the aspects of Fourier's doctrine that sounded reasonable, not his more 'poetic' beliefs. He was one of the first historians of the Fourierist school and of early French utopian socialism more generally. He also wrote numerous other works on sociological, economic, philosophical and anthropological topics. By profession, Pellarin was a naval doctor. He travelled widely and wrote about his voyages. He was particularly disturbed by encountering slavery in the French colonies and became an advocate for its abolition, not only on French territory but everywhere. Unlike some abolitionists, Pellarin called not only for the 'emancipation of blacks' but also for their enfranchisement. In his articles he also criticised the brutality of French military discipline and the condition of the industrial proletariat. Pellarin's socialism was ethically motivated and linked to his medical commitment to the easing of suffering. He also wrote about the social role of medicine. Pellarin laid claim to some medical discoveries; e.g., he claimed to be the first to propose an explanation of sea sickness in terms of the variations of blood flow caused by the balance of the seafarer.

== Historical theory ==
Pellarin divided history into five great stages: a state of nature he called 'edenism' (after the Garden of Eden), followed by 'savagery', 'patriarchy', 'barbarism' and 'civilisation'. Civilisation in turn went through periods of infancy, adolescence and maturity and was now in a state of decline; its latest stage was 'industrial feudalism'. Civilisation would subsequently give way to socialism, conceived along communitarian lines.

== Politics ==
Since his youth, Pellarin sympathised with left wing republicanism, but he was willing to countenance other political forms, such as constitutional monarchy, provided the government could be induced to adopt social reforms. Pellarin supported the Revolution of 1848 and tried without much success to get the Second Republic to implement such policies as a minimum wage, profit sharing for workers, universal medical insurance and government-sponsored model communities or phalansteries. Like most socialists, Pellarin opposed the "Caesarist adventurer" Louis Bonaparte. He lived long enough to witness the Paris Commune of 1871, though he was not actively involved in its affairs. Though not unsympathetic to the 'explosion' of the Commune, Pellarin—who was greatly disturbed by the drowning of a policeman he witnessed—deplored the violence and took it as a symptom of the "moral abasement and total lack of energy of the population."

== Scholarly affiliations ==
Pellarin was a member of the French Society of Anthropology, the Brest Academic Society and several other learned associations. He died in Paris on 13 December 1883. His papers are stored at the Institut de France.

== Quote ==
"L'esclavage, le servage, le salariat, telles ont été les solutions successivement données à cette grande et vitale question du travail: solutions qui toutes les trois blessent, -- dans une mesure très différente à la vérité, -- mais enfin qui blessent la justice, ainsi que la dignité humaine".

("Slavery, serfdom and wage labour, such are the solutions successively given to this grand and vital question of labour: solutions which all three of them injure -- in a very different measure it is true -- but which nevertheless injure justice as well as human dignity.")

== Selected works ==
- 1840: Théorie Sociétaire. (Extant: the fourth edition from 1849.)
- 1840: Sur le Droit de Propriété: Réponse à quelques Attaques.
- 1843: Charles, Fourier: Sa Vie et sa Théorie. (Fourth edition, 1849.)
- 1864: Essai Critique sur la Philosophie Positive
- 1868: Qu'est-Ce Que la Civilisation?: Lecture Faite la Société d'Anthropologie de Paris Dana, la Séance du 18 Juillet 1867.
- 1868: Souvenirs anecdotiques: Médecine Navale, Saint-Simonisme, Chouannerie.
- 1872: Considérations sur le Progrès et la Classification des Sociétés. (Bulletin of the Société d'Anthropologie.)
- 1874: Lettre de Fourier au Grand Juge: 4 Nivose An XII.
- 1876: La Question du Travail.
- 1877: Notice sur Jules Lechevalier et Abel Transon.
- 1877: Une Page de l'Histoire du Saint-Simonisme et du Fourierisme.
- 1879: Cent-septième Anniversaire de Fourier: Necrologie Phalanstérienne.

== Sources ==
- Guengant, J.-Y., 'Charles Pellarin, l’Enfance d’une Passion (1805–1833).'
- 'Charles Pellarin (1804–1883)'. Les Premiers Socialismes. Bibliothèque virtuelle de l'Université de Poitiers. Online at: http://premierssocialismes.edel.univ-poitiers.fr/index.php?id=719.
- 'Charles Pellarin (1804–1883)'. Cedias: Musée social.
- Pellarin, Ch., Souvenirs anecdotiques: médecine navale, saint-simonisme, chouannerie, 1868, Librairie des sciences sociales, Paris-France. Read online link
- Guénel, J., 'Charles Pellarin (1804–1883)'. Société des Études saint-simoniennes. Online at: https://web.archive.org/web/20160303171905/http://lire.ish-lyon.cnrs.fr/ESS/medecins.html#p16.
- Beecher, J., Charles Fourier. The Visionary and His World. Berkeley, 1987.

Catrgory:19th-century French medical doctors
