= Hyperplane at infinity =

Concept in geometry

In geometry, any hyperplane H of a projective space P may be taken as a hyperplane at infinity. Then the set complement P ∖ H is called an affine space. For instance, if (x_{1}, ..., x_{n}, x_{n+1}) are homogeneous coordinates for n-dimensional projective space, then the equation x_{n+1} = 0 defines a hyperplane at infinity for the n-dimensional affine space with coordinates (x_{1}, ..., x_{n}). H is also called the ideal hyperplane.

Similarly, starting from an affine space A, every class of parallel lines can be associated with a point at infinity. The union over all classes of parallels constitute the points of the hyperplane at infinity. Adjoining the points of this hyperplane (called ideal points) to A converts it into an n-dimensional projective space, such as the real projective space RP^{n}.

By adding these ideal points, the entire affine space A is completed to a projective space P, which may be called the projective completion of A. Each affine subspace S of A is completed to a projective subspace of P by adding to S all the ideal points corresponding to the directions of the lines contained in S. The resulting projective subspaces are often called affine subspaces of the projective space P, as opposed to the infinite or ideal subspaces, which are the subspaces of the hyperplane at infinity (however, they are projective spaces, not affine spaces).

In the projective space, each projective subspace of dimension k intersects the ideal hyperplane in a projective subspace "at infinity" whose dimension is k − 1.

A pair of non-parallel affine hyperplanes intersect at an affine subspace of dimension n − 2, but a parallel pair of affine hyperplanes intersect at a projective subspace of the ideal hyperplane (the intersection lies on the ideal hyperplane). Thus, parallel hyperplanes, which did not meet in the affine space, intersect in the projective completion due to the addition of the hyperplane at infinity.

== See also ==
- Line at infinity
- Plane at infinity
