= Affine sphere =

Mathematical concept

In affine differential geometry, an affine sphere is a hypersurface for which the affine normals all intersect in a single point The term affine sphere is used because they play an analogous role in affine differential geometry to that of ordinary spheres in Euclidean differential geometry.

An affine sphere is called improper or parabolic if all of the affine normals are constant. In that case, the intersection point mentioned above lies on the hyperplane at infinity. If it is not improper, then it is proper. A proper sphere is elliptic iff its mean affine curvature $H > 0$, and hyperbolic iff $H < 0$.

== Examples ==
- All quadrics are affine spheres.
- Under technical assumptions, the only parabolic affine sphere is the elliptic paraboloid, and the only elliptic affine sphere is the ellipsoid.
- In $\R^n$, the hyper surface $\prod_{i=1}^n x_i = 1$ is a hyperbolic affine sphere centered at the origin, even though it is not a quadric.
- If ƒ is a smooth function on the plane and the determinant of the Hessian matrix is ±1 then the graph of ƒ in three-space is an improper affine sphere.

== Monge–Ampère equation ==
The graph of a locally strictly convex function $f: \R^n \to \R$ is a hypersurface $M \subset \R^{n+1}$ .

Then, $M$ is a affine sphere centered at the origin or infinity iff it solves
$$\det [ \partial^2_{ij} f ] = \begin{cases}(H f)^{-n-2}, & \text { if } H \neq 0 \\ 1, & \text { if } H=0\end{cases}$$
for some $H \geq 0$. If it is, then $H$ is the mean affine curvature of $M$. This equation is an elliptic Monge–Ampère equation. This produces a very strong constraint on affine spheres. By a result due to Jörgens, Calabi, and Pogorelov, (under some technical hypotheses) the only improper affine sphere is an elliptic paraboloid, and the only elliptic affine sphere is an ellipsoid.

=== Hyperbolic case ===
Hyperbolic affine spheres are much more interesting and less well-understood. Similarly, hyperbolic Monge–Ampère equations are also less well-understood.

Most examples are known only implicitly, in the sense that they are proven to exist, without explicit formulas describing them.

The following theorem was conjectured by Calabi and proven by Cheng and Yau:

Theorem—Every complete, n-dimensional affine sphere with mean curvature $H< 0$ is asymptotic to the boundary of a convex cone with vertex at the center. Every uniformly convex cone $K$ determines an affine sphere of hyperbolic type, which is asymptotic to the cone $K$, and uniquely determined by the mean curvature.

In fact, Chern and Yau proved more, that these hyperbolic spheres come in families. Define a sharp cone in $\R^{n+1}$ to be a closed subset $K \subset \R^{n+1}$ such that it is a union of rays leaving the origin, and such that it contains no full-line through the origin. Equivalently, it means that there exists a supporting plane of $K$ that touches $K$ only at the origin.

Theorem—If $K \subset \R^{n+1}$ is a sharp and convex cone, then its interior has a unique foliation into $\cup_{r > 0} L_r$ such that each $L_r$ is a hyperbolic affine sphere of mean curvature $-r^2$.

Equivalently, consider the Monge–Ampère equation $\det [ \partial^2_{ij} f ] = e^{2f}$ for $f : \operatorname{int}(K) \to \R$, with conditions

- $f \to +\infty$ as $x \to \partial K$;
- $\partial_{ij}^2 f dx^i dx^j$ is a complete Riemannian metric.

Then it has a unique solution, whose level sets are the foliation $\cup_{r > 0} L_r$.

The construction is implicit. Explicit representation is generally unknown, even in the case where $K$ is a polyhedral cone.

== See also ==
- Affine differential geometry
- Hypersurface
- Quadric
- Monge–Ampère equation
- Hessian matrix
- Supporting hyperplane
- Hyperplane at infinity
- Convex cone
- Polyhedral cone
- Ellipsoid
- Elliptic paraboloid
