= Hypersurface =

Manifold or algebraic variety of dimension n in a space of dimension n+1

In geometry, a hypersurface is a generalization of the concepts of hyperplane, plane curve, and surface. A hypersurface is a manifold or an algebraic variety of dimension n − 1, which is embedded in an ambient space of dimension n, generally a Euclidean space, an affine space or a projective space. Hypersurfaces share, with surfaces in a three-dimensional space, the property of being defined by a single implicit equation, at least locally (near every point), and sometimes globally.

A hypersurface in a (Euclidean, affine, or projective) space of dimension two is a plane curve. In a space of dimension three, it is a surface.

For example, the equation

$$x_1^2+x_2^2+\cdots+x_n^2-1=0$$

defines an algebraic hypersurface of dimension n − 1 in the Euclidean space of dimension n. This hypersurface is also a smooth manifold, and is called a hypersphere or an (n – 1)-sphere.

== Smooth hypersurface ==
A hypersurface that is a smooth manifold is called a smooth hypersurface.

In R^{n}, a smooth hypersurface is orientable. Every connected compact smooth hypersurface is a level set, and separates R^{n} into two connected components; this is related to the Jordan–Brouwer separation theorem.

== Affine algebraic hypersurface ==
An algebraic hypersurface is an algebraic variety that may be defined by a single implicit equation of the form

$$p(x_1, \ldots, x_n)=0,$$

where p is a multivariate polynomial. Generally the polynomial is supposed to be irreducible. When this is not the case, the hypersurface is not an algebraic variety, but only an algebraic set. It may depend on the authors or the context whether a reducible polynomial defines a hypersurface. For avoiding ambiguity, the term irreducible hypersurface is often used.

As for algebraic varieties, the coefficients of the defining polynomial may belong to any fixed field k, and the points of the hypersurface are the zeros of p in the affine space $K^n,$ where K is an algebraically closed extension of k.

A hypersurface may have singularities, which are the common zeros, if any, of the defining polynomial and its partial derivatives. In particular, a real algebraic hypersurface is not necessarily a manifold.

=== Properties ===
Hypersurfaces have some specific properties that are not shared with other algebraic varieties.

One of the main such properties is Hilbert's Nullstellensatz, which asserts that a hypersurface contains a given algebraic set if and only if the defining polynomial of the hypersurface has a power that belongs to the ideal generated by the defining polynomials of the algebraic set.

A corollary of this theorem is that, if two irreducible polynomials (or more generally two square-free polynomials) define the same hypersurface, then one is the product of the other by a nonzero constant.

Hypersurfaces are exactly the subvarieties of dimension n – 1 of an affine space of dimension of n. This is the geometric interpretation of the fact that, in a polynomial ring over a field, the height of an ideal is 1 if and only if the ideal is a principal ideal. In the case of possibly reducible hypersurfaces, this result may be restated as follows: hypersurfaces are exactly the algebraic sets whose all irreducible components have dimension n – 1.

=== Real and rational points ===
A real hypersurface is a hypersurface that is defined by a polynomial with real coefficients. In this case the algebraically closed field over which the points are defined is generally the field $\mathbb C$ of complex numbers. The real points of a real hypersurface are the points that belong to $\mathbb R^n \subset \mathbb C^n.$ The set of the real points of a real hypersurface is the real part of the hypersurface. Often, it is left to the context whether the term hypersurface refers to all points or only to the real part.

If the coefficients of the defining polynomial belong to a field k that is not algebraically closed (typically the field of rational numbers, a finite field or a number field), one says that the hypersurface is defined over k, and the points that belong to $k^n$ are rational over k (in the case of the field of rational numbers, "over k" is generally omitted).

For example, the imaginary n-sphere defined by the equation

$$x_0^2 +\cdots+x_n^2 +1=0$$

is a real hypersurface without any real point, which is defined over the rational numbers. It has no rational point, but has many points that are rational over the Gaussian rationals.

== Projective algebraic hypersurface ==
A projective (algebraic) hypersurface of dimension n – 1 in a projective space of dimension n over a field k is defined by a homogeneous polynomial $P(x_0, x_1, \ldots, x_n)$ in n + 1 indeterminates. As usual, homogeneous polynomial means that all monomials of P have the same degree, or, equivalently that $P(cx_0, cx_1, \ldots, cx_n)=c^dP(x_0, x_1, \ldots, x_n)$ for every constant c, where d is the degree of the polynomial. The points of the hypersurface are the points of the projective space whose projective coordinates are zeros of P.

If one chooses the hyperplane of equation $x_0=0$ as hyperplane at infinity, the complement of this hyperplane is an affine space, and the points of the projective hypersurface that belong to this affine space form an affine hypersurface of equation $P(1, x_1, \ldots, x_n) = 0.$ Conversely, given an affine hypersurface of equation $p(x_1, \ldots, x_n)=0,$ it defines a projective hypersurface, called its projective completion, whose equation is obtained by homogenizing p. That is, the equation of the projective completion is $P(x_0, x_1, \ldots, x_n) = 0,$ with

$$P(x_0, x_1, \ldots, x_n) = x_0^dp(x_1/x_0, \ldots, x_n/x_0),$$

where d is the degree of P.

These two processes projective completion and restriction to an affine subspace are inverse one to the other. Therefore, an affine hypersurface and its projective completion have essentially the same properties, and are often considered as two points-of-view for the same hypersurface.

However, it may occur that an affine hypersurface is nonsingular, while its projective completion has singular points. In this case, one says that the affine surface is singular at infinity. For example, the circular cylinder of equation

$$x^2+y^2-1=0$$

in the affine space of dimension three has a unique singular point, which is at infinity, in the direction x = 0, y = 0.

== See also ==
- Affine sphere
- Coble hypersurface
- Dwork family
- Null hypersurface
- Polar hypersurface
