= Carathéodory conjecture =

Conjecture in differential geometry

In differential geometry, the Carathéodory conjecture is a mathematical conjecture attributed to Constantin Carathéodory by Hans Ludwig Hamburger, stating that any convex, closed and sufficiently smooth surface in three dimensional Euclidean space must admit at least two umbilic points.

Much of the early work on the conjecture concerned the real-analytic case. Beginning with Hamburger's work, several proofs and revisions were subsequently given by Gerrit Bol, Tilla Klotz and Charles J. Titus.. Klotz identified a gap in Bol's proof, while Hanspeter Scherbel later argued that the proofs of Klotz and Titus also contained gaps.

In the more general smooth case, however, Levent Alpöge announced in August 2026 an explicit $C^\infty$ counterexample checked with John-Paul Smith and Anthropic's artificial-intelligence system Claude.

== Inception ==
Hamburger attributed the conjecture to Carathéodory in a session of the Berlin Mathematical Society in 1924. Carathéodory never committed the conjecture to writing, but did publish a paper on a related subject. J.E. Littlewood mentions the conjecture and Hamburger's contribution as an example of a mathematical claim that is easy to state but difficult to prove. Dirk Struik describes the formal analogy of the conjecture with the four-vertex theorem for plane curves. Modern references to the conjecture include the problem list of Shing-Tung Yau, the books of Marcel Berger, and other books.

== Statement of the conjecture ==
The conjecture claims that any convex, closed and sufficiently smooth surface in three dimensional Euclidean space must admit at least two umbilic points, where the normal curvatures in all directions are equal or equivalently both principal curvatures are equal. In the sense of the conjecture, the spheroid with only two umbilic points and the sphere, all points of which are umbilic, are examples of surfaces with minimal and maximal numbers of the umbilicus.

For the conjecture to be well posed, with well-defined umbilic points, the surface needs to be at least twice differentiable.

== The case of real analytic surfaces ==
Stefan Cohn-Vossen gave an invited address on the subject to the International Congress of Mathematicians of 1928 in Bologna, and in the 1929 edition of Wilhelm Blaschke's third volume on Differential Geometry he states:

While this book goes into print, Mr. Cohn-Vossen has succeeded in proving that closed real-analytic surfaces do not have umbilic points of index > 2 (invited talk at the ICM in Bologna 1928). This proves the conjecture of Carathéodory for such surfaces, namely that they need to have at least two umbilics.

Here Blaschke's index is twice the usual definition for an index of an umbilic point, and the global conjecture follows by the Poincaré–Hopf index theorem. No paper was submitted by Cohn-Vossen to the proceedings of the International Congress, while in later editions of Blaschke's book the above comments were removed. It is thus likely that this work was inconclusive.

For analytic surfaces, an affirmative answer to the conjecture was given in 1940 by Hans Hamburger in a long paper published in three parts. The approach of Hamburger was also via a local index estimate for isolated umbilics, which he had shown to imply the conjecture in his earlier work. In 1943, a shorter proof was proposed by Gerrit Bol, see also, but, in 1959, Tilla Klotz found and corrected a gap in Bol's proof. Hanspeter Scherbel's 1993 dissertation, in turn, argued that Klotz's proof was incomplete. There have been several other relevant publications.

The putative proofs mentioned above are based on Hamburger's reduction of the Carathéodory conjecture to the following conjecture:

The index of every isolated umbilic point is never greater than one.

Roughly speaking, the main difficulty lies in the resolution of singularities generated by umbilical points. All the above-mentioned authors resolve the singularities by induction on 'degree of degeneracy' of the umbilical point, but they were unable to present the induction process clearly. In 2002, Vladimir Ivanov revisited the work of Hamburger on analytic surfaces, stating:

First, considering analytic surfaces, we assert with full responsibility that Carathéodory was right. Second, we know how this can be proved rigorously. Third, we intend to exhibit here a proof which, in our opinion, will convince every reader who is really ready to undertake a long and tiring journey with us.

First he follows the method Gerrit Bol and Tilla Klotz, but later proposes his own method of singularity resolution based on complex analytic techniques of implicit functions, Weierstrass preparation theorem, Puiseux series, and circular root systems.

== Application of the analytic index bound ==
Hamburger's umbilic index bound for analytic surfaces leads to restrictions on the position of the roots of certain types of holomorphic polynomials. In particular, a holomorphic polynomial is said to be self-inversive if the set of roots is invariant under reflection in the unit circle. It can be shown that for a polynomial with self-inversive second derivative, none of whose roots lie on the unit circle, the number of roots (counted with multiplicity) inside the unit circle is less than or equal to ⌊N/2⌋ + 1. The proof takes any holomorphic polynomial with the stipulated properties and constructs a real analytic surface with an isolated umbilic point. The index is determined by the number of zeros of the polynomial that lie inside the unit circle, and then Hamburger's bound yields the stated result.

== The general smooth case ==
In 2008, Brendan Guilfoyle and Wilhelm H. Klingenberg announced a proof of the global conjecture for surfaces of smoothness $C^{3,\alpha}$, and in 2025 they claimed that three subsequent papers, that they had published, established the conjecture.

In 2012, Mohammad Ghomi and Ralph Howard showed, using a Möbius transformation, that the global conjecture for surfaces of smoothness $C^2$ can be reformulated in terms of the number of umbilic points on graphs subject to certain asymptotics of the gradient. They also constructed weak counterexamples to the conjecture: $C^1$ convex surfaces which were $C^\infty$ in the complement of a point and had only one umbilic point.

In August 2026, Levent Alpöge announced an explicit $C^\infty$ counterexample. He gave a family of functions $g_k$ and stated that $g_2$ is the support function of a smooth convex body with exactly one umbilic point, whose index is 2. In the announcement, Alpöge credited John-Paul Smith and Claude with checking the construction.

== See also ==
- Differential geometry of surfaces
- Second fundamental form
- Principal curvature
- Umbilical point
- Gömböc
