= Earth radius =

Distance from the Earth surface to a point near its center

- Equatorial (a), polar (b) and arithmetic mean Earth radii as defined in the 1984 World Geodetic System revision (not to scale)
- Other names: terrestrial radius
- Common symbols: R_{🜨}, R_{E}, a, b, a_{E}, b_{E}, R_{eE}, R_{pE}
- SI unit: meters
- In SI base units: m
- Behaviour under coord transformation: scalar
- Dimension: $\mathsf{L}$
- Value: Equatorial radius: a = (6378137.0 m); Polar radius: b = (6356752.3 m)

Nominal Earth radius
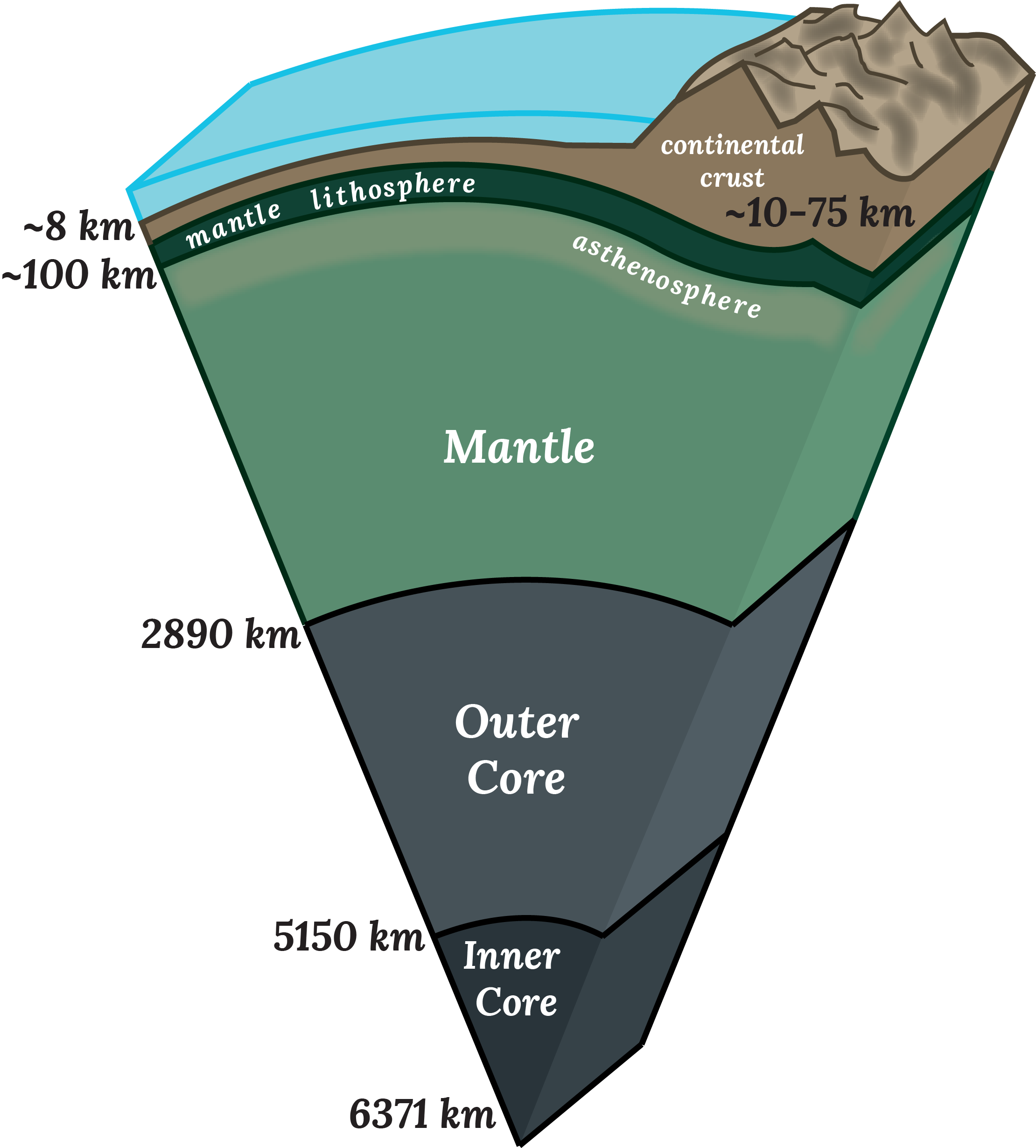
- Cross section of Earth's Interior

General information
- Unit system: astronomy, geophysics
- Unit of: distance
- Symbol: $\mathcal{R}^\mathrm N_\mathrm{E}$, $\mathcal{R}^\mathrm N_{e\mathrm{E}}$, $\mathcal{R}^\mathrm N_{p\mathrm{E}}$

Conversions
1 $\mathcal{R}^\mathrm N_\mathrm{E}$ in ...	... is equal to ...
- SI base unit: 6.3781×10^{6} m
- Metric system: 6357 to 6378 km
- English units: 3950 to 3963 mi

Earth radius (denoted as R_{🜨} or R_{E}) is the distance from the center of Earth to a point on or near its surface. Approximating the figure of Earth by an Earth spheroid (an oblate ellipsoid), the radius ranges from a maximum (equatorial radius, denoted a) of about 6378 km (3963 mi) to a minimum (polar radius, denoted b) of nearly 6357 km (3950 mi).

The globally averaged value is 6371 kilometres (3959 mi) with a 0.3% variability (±10 km) for the following reasons. The International Union of Geodesy and Geophysics (IUGG) provides three reference values: the mean radius (R_{1}) of three radii measured at two equator points and a pole; the authalic radius, which is the radius of a sphere with the same surface area (R_{2}); and the volumetric radius, which is the radius of a sphere having the same volume as the ellipsoid (R_{3}). All three values are about 6371 kilometres (3959 mi).

Other ways to define and measure the Earth's radius involve either the spheroid's radius of curvature or the actual topography. A few definitions yield values outside the range between the polar radius and equatorial radius because they account for localized effects.

A nominal Earth radius (denoted $\mathcal{R}^\mathrm N_\mathrm{E}$) is sometimes used as a unit of measurement in astronomy and geophysics, a conversion factor used when expressing planetary properties as multiples or fractions of a constant terrestrial radius; if the choice between equatorial or polar radii is not explicit, the equatorial radius is to be assumed, as recommended by the International Astronomical Union (IAU).

== Introduction ==
A scale diagram of the oblateness of the 2003 IERS reference ellipsoid, with north at the top. The light blue region is a circle. The outer edge of the dark blue line is an ellipse with the same minor axis as the circle and the same eccentricity as the Earth. The red line represents the Karman line 100 km (62 mi) above sea level, while the yellow area denotes the altitude range of the ISS in low Earth orbit.

Earth's rotation, internal density variations, and external tidal forces cause its shape to deviate systematically from a perfect sphere. (Note: For details see figure of the Earth, geoid, and Earth tide.) Local topography increases the variance, resulting in a surface of profound complexity. Our descriptions of Earth's surface must be simpler than reality in order to be tractable. Hence, we create models to approximate characteristics of Earth's surface, generally relying on the simplest model that suits the need.

Each of the models in common use involve some notion of the geometric radius. Strictly speaking, spheres are the only solids to have radii, but broader uses of the term radius are common in many fields, including those dealing with models of Earth. The following is a partial list of models of Earth's surface, ordered from exact to more approximate:

- The actual surface of Earth
- The geoid, defined by mean sea level at each point on the real surface (Note: There is no single center to the geoid; it varies according to local geodetic conditions. Where there is land, the geoid is generally below ground; it represents where the sea level would be if water could reach it from the ocean via an imaginary canal.)
- A spheroid, also called an ellipsoid of revolution, geocentric to model the entire Earth, or else geodetic for regional work (Note: In a geocentric ellipsoid, the center of the ellipsoid coincides with some computed center of Earth, and best models the earth as a whole. Geodetic ellipsoids are better suited to regional idiosyncrasies of the geoid. A partial surface of an ellipsoid gets fitted to the region, in which case the center and orientation of the ellipsoid generally do not coincide with the earth's center of mass or axis of rotation.)
- A sphere

In the case of the geoid and ellipsoids, the fixed distance from any point on the model to the specified center is called "a radius of the Earth" or "the radius of the Earth at that point". (Note: The value of the radius is completely dependent upon the latitude in the case of an ellipsoid model, and nearly so on the geoid.) It is also common to refer to any mean radius of a spherical model as "the radius of the earth". When considering the Earth's real surface, on the other hand, it is uncommon to refer to a "radius", since there is generally no practical need. Rather, elevation above or below sea level is useful.

Regardless of the model, any of these geocentric radii falls between the polar minimum of about 6357 km and the equatorial maximum of about 6378 km (3950 to 3963 mi). Hence, the Earth deviates from a perfect sphere by only a third of a percent, which supports the spherical model in most contexts and justifies the term "radius of the Earth". While specific values differ, the concepts in this article generalize to any major planet.

=== Physics of Earth's deformation ===
Rotation of a planet causes it to approximate an oblate ellipsoid/spheroid with a bulge at the equator and flattening at the North and South Poles, so that the equatorial radius a is larger than the polar radius b by approximately aq. The oblateness constant q is given by

$$q=\frac{a^3 \omega^2}{GM},$$

where ω is the angular frequency, G is the gravitational constant, and M is the mass of the planet. (Note: This follows from the International Astronomical Union definition rule (2): a planet assumes a shape due to hydrostatic equilibrium where gravity and centrifugal forces are nearly balanced.) For the Earth 1/q ≈ 289, which is close to the measured inverse flattening 1/f ≈ 298.257. Additionally, the bulge at the equator shows slow variations. The bulge had been decreasing, but since 1998 the bulge has increased, possibly due to redistribution of ocean mass via currents.

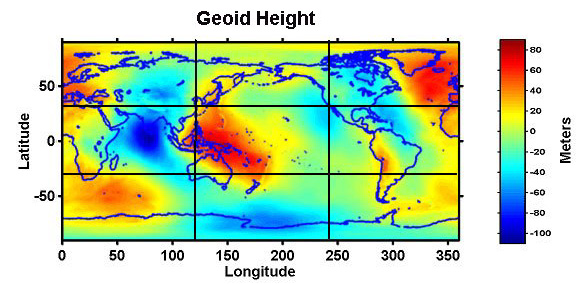

The variation in density and crustal thickness causes gravity to vary across the surface and in time, so that the mean sea level differs from the ellipsoid. This difference is the geoid height, positive above or outside the ellipsoid, negative below or inside. The geoid height variation is under 110 m (360 ft) on Earth. The geoid height can change abruptly due to earthquakes (such as the Sumatra-Andaman earthquake) or reduction in ice masses (such as Greenland).

Not all deformations originate within the Earth. Gravitational attraction from the Moon or Sun can cause the Earth's surface at a given point to vary by tenths of a meter over a nearly 12-hour period (see Earth tide).

=== Radius and local conditions ===
Al-Biruni's (973 – c. 1050) method for calculation of the Earth's radius simplified measuring the circumference compared to taking measurements from two locations distant from each other.

Given local and transient influences on surface height, the values defined below are based on a "general purpose" model, refined as globally precisely as possible within 5 m (16 ft) of reference ellipsoid height, and to within 100 m (330 ft) of mean sea level (neglecting geoid height).

Additionally, the radius can be estimated from the curvature of the Earth at a point. Like a torus, the curvature at a point will be greatest (tightest) in one direction (north–south on Earth) and smallest (flattest) perpendicularly (east–west). The corresponding radius of curvature depends on the location and direction of measurement from that point. A consequence is that a distance to the true horizon at the equator is slightly shorter in the north–south direction than in the east–west direction.

In summary, local variations in terrain prevent defining a single "precise" radius. One can only adopt an idealized model. Since the estimate by Eratosthenes, many models have been created. Historically, these models were based on regional topography, giving the best reference ellipsoid for the area under survey. As satellite remote sensing and especially the Global Positioning System gained importance, true global models were developed which, while not as accurate for regional work, best approximate the Earth as a whole.

== Extrema: equatorial and polar radii ==
The following radii are derived from the World Geodetic System 1984 (WGS-84) reference ellipsoid. It is an idealized surface, and the Earth measurements used to calculate it have an uncertainty of ±2 m in both the equatorial and polar dimensions. Additional discrepancies caused by topographical variation at specific locations can be significant. When identifying the position of an observable location, the use of more precise values for WGS-84 radii may not yield a corresponding improvement in accuracy.

The value for the equatorial radius is defined to the nearest 0.1 m in WGS-84. The value for the polar radius in this section has been rounded to the nearest 0.1 m, which is expected to be adequate for most uses. Refer to the WGS-84 ellipsoid if a more precise value for its polar radius is needed.

- The Earth's equatorial radius a, or semi-major axis, is the distance from its center to the equator and equals 6,378.1370 km (3,963.1906 mi). The equatorial radius is often used to compare Earth with other planets.
- The Earth's polar radius b, or semi-minor axis is the distance from its center to the North and South Poles, and equals 6356.7523 km (3949.9028 mi).

== Location-dependent radii ==
Various radii as a function of latitude.

=== Geocentric radius ===
The geocentric radius is the distance from the Earth's center to a point on the spheroid surface at geodetic latitude φ, given by the formula

$$R(\varphi)=\sqrt{\frac{(a^2\cos\varphi)^2+(b^2\sin\varphi)^2}{(a\cos\varphi)^2+(b\sin\varphi)^2}},$$

where a and b are, respectively, the equatorial radius and the polar radius.

The maximum and minimum geocentric radii on the ellipsoid coincide, respectively, with the equatorial and polar radii, at the vertices of the ellipse. However, the maximum and minimum radii of curvature coincide with the poles and Equator, in opposite regions than the geocentric radii, due to Earth's oblateness.

=== Radii of curvature ===
==== Principal radii of curvature ====
There are two principal radii of curvature: along the meridional and prime-vertical normal sections.

Derivation

The principal curvatures are the roots of Equation (125) in:

$$(E G - F^2) \kappa^2 - (e G + g E - 2 f F) \kappa + (e g - f^2) = 0
= \det(A - \kappa B),$$

where in the first fundamental form for a surface (Equation (112) in):

$$ds^2 = \sum_{ij} a_{ij} dw^i dw^j = E \,d\varphi^2 + 2 F \,d\varphi \,d\lambda + G \,d\lambda^2,$$

E, F, and G are elements of the metric tensor:

$$A = a_{ij} = \sum_\nu \frac{\partial r^\nu}{\partial w^i} \frac{\partial r^\nu}{\partial w^j}
= \begin{bmatrix} E & F \\ F & G \end{bmatrix},$$

$r = [r^1, r^2, r^3]^T = [x, y, z]^T$, $w^1 = \varphi$, $w^2 = \lambda,$

in the second fundamental form for a surface (Equation (123) in):

$$2 D = \sum_{ij} b_{ij} dw^i dw^j =  e \,d\varphi^2 + 2 f \,d\varphi \,d\lambda + g \,d\lambda^2,$$

e, f, and g are elements of the shape tensor:

$$B = b_{ij} = \sum_\nu n^\nu \frac{\partial ^2 r^\nu}{\partial w^i \partial w^j}
= \begin{bmatrix} e & f \\ f & g \end{bmatrix},$$

$n = \frac{N}{|N|}$ is the unit normal to the surface at $r$, and because $\frac{\partial r}{\partial \varphi}$ and $\frac{\partial r}{\partial \lambda}$ are tangents to the surface,

$$N = \frac{\partial r}{\partial \varphi} \times \frac{\partial r}{\partial \lambda}$$

is normal to the surface at $r$.

With $F = f = 0$ for an oblate spheroid, the curvatures are

$\kappa_1 = \frac{g}{G}$ and $\kappa_2 = \frac{e}{E},$

and the principal radii of curvature are

$R_1 = \frac{1}{\kappa_1}$ and $R_2 = \frac{1}{\kappa_2}.$

The first and second radii of curvature correspond, respectively, to the Earth's meridional and prime-vertical radii of curvature.

Geometrically, the second fundamental form gives the distance from $r + dr$ to the plane tangent at $r$.

===== Meridional =====
In particular, the Earth's meridional radius of curvature (in the north–south direction) at φ is

$$M(\varphi)=\frac{(ab)^2}{\big((a\cos\varphi)^2+(b\sin\varphi)^2\big)^\frac32}
=\frac{a(1-e^2)}{(1-e^2\sin^2\varphi)^\frac32}
=\frac{1-e^2}{a^2} N(\varphi)^3,$$

where $e$ is the eccentricity of the earth. This is the radius that Eratosthenes measured in his arc measurement.

===== Prime vertical =====
The length PQ, called the prime vertical radius, is $N(\phi).$ The length IQ is equal to $e^2 N(\phi).$ $R = (X, Y, Z).$

If one point had appeared due east of the other, one finds the approximate curvature in the east–west direction. (Note: East–west directions can be misleading. Point B, which appears due east from A, will be closer to the equator than A. Thus the curvature found this way is smaller than the curvature of a circle of constant latitude, except at the equator. West can be exchanged for east in this discussion.) This Earth's prime-vertical radius of curvature, also called the Earth's transverse radius of curvature, is defined perpendicular (orthogonal) to M at geodetic latitude φ (Note: N is defined as the radius of curvature in the plane that is normal to both the surface of the ellipsoid at, and the meridian passing through, the specific point of interest.) and is

$$N(\varphi)=\frac{a^2}{\sqrt{(a\cos\varphi)^2+(b\sin\varphi)^2}}
=\frac{a}{\sqrt{1-e^2\sin^2\varphi}}.$$

N can also be interpreted geometrically as the normal distance from the ellipsoid surface to the polar axis. The radius of a parallel of latitude is given by $p=N\cos(\varphi)$.

==== Combined radii of curvature ====
===== Azimuthal =====
Euler radius vs. azimuth at various latitudes

Earth's azimuthal radius of curvature of an Earth normal section at an azimuth (measured clockwise from north) α and at latitude φ, is derived from Euler's curvature formula as follows:

$$R_\mathrm{c}=\frac{1}{\dfrac{\cos^2\alpha}{M}+\dfrac{\sin^2\alpha}{N}}$$

or

$$R_\mathrm{c}^{-1}=M^{-1}\cos^2\alpha + N^{-1}\sin^2\alpha,$$

where $R_\mathrm{c}^{-1}$ is the azimuthal curvature of the ellipsoid.

===== Non-directional (Gaussian and mean) =====
Difference between mean and Gaussian radii of curvature

It is possible to combine the principal radii of curvature above in a non-directional manner.

Earth's Gaussian radius of curvature at latitude φ is

$$R_\text{a}(\varphi) = \frac{1}{\sqrt{K}} = \frac{1}{2\pi}\int_{0}^{2\pi}R_\text{c}(\alpha)\,d\alpha,$$

or

$$R_\text{a}(\varphi) = \sqrt{MN} = \frac{a^2b}{(a\cos\varphi)^2+(b\sin\varphi)^2}
= \frac{a\sqrt{1-e^2}}{1-e^2\sin^2\varphi},$$

where K is the Gaussian curvature, $K = \kappa_1\,\kappa_2.$ The Gaussian radius of curvature is defined in terms of the product of the principal radii of curvature and it integrates the azimuthal radius of curvature $R_\mathrm{c}$ over the full circle. It corresponds to the radius of the osculating sphere that best fits the ellipsoid locally.

Earth's radius of mean curvature at latitude φ is

$$R_\text{m} = \frac{2}{\dfrac{1}{M} + \dfrac{1}{N}}$$

or

$$R_\text{m}^{-1} = \frac{M^{-1} + N^{-1}}{2} = \frac{1}{2\pi}\int_0^{2\pi} R_c^{-1}(\theta) \;d\theta.$$

The mean curvature $R_\text{m}^{-1}$ equals the arithmetic mean of the two principal curvatures and integrates the azimuthal curvature $R_\mathrm{c}^{-1}$ over the full circle.

===== Equatorial radii of curvature =====
Earth's meridional radius of curvature at the equator equals the meridian's semi-latus rectum:

$$M(0\text{°})=\frac{b^2}{a}=\ell=6,335.439 \text{ km.}$$

Earth's prime-vertical radius of curvature at the equator equals the equatorial radius,

$$N(0\text{°})=a$$

Earth's Gaussian radius of curvature at the equator simplifies to the polar radius (not the equatorial radius):

$$R_\text{a}(0\text{°})=b$$

Earth's mean radius of curvature at the equator involves the semi-latus rectum:

$$R_\text{m}(0\text{°})=2 (a \cdot \ell)/(a + \ell) = 6,356.716 \text{ km.}$$

===== Polar radii of curvature =====
Earth's radius of curvature at the poles (either meridional or prime-vertical) is

$$M(90\text{°})=N(90\text{°})=\frac{a^2}{b}=6,399.594 \text{ km.}$$

Earth's Gaussian or mean radii of curvature at the poles also equal the principal radii of curvature at the poles (not the polar radius):

$$R_\text{a}(90\text{°})=R_\text{m}(90\text{°})=\frac{a^2}{b}$$

== Global radii ==
The Earth can be modeled as a sphere in many ways. This section describes the common ways. The various radii derived here use the notation and dimensions noted above for the Earth as derived from the WGS-84 ellipsoid; namely,

Equatorial radius: a = (6378.1370 km)
Polar radius: b = (6356.7523 km)

A sphere being a gross approximation of the spheroid, which itself is an approximation of the geoid, units are given here in kilometers rather than the millimeter resolution appropriate for geodesy.

=== Arithmetic mean radius ===
Equatorial (a), polar (b) and arithmetic mean Earth radii as defined in the 1984 World Geodetic System revision (not to scale)

In geophysics, the International Union of Geodesy and Geophysics (IUGG) defines the Earth's arithmetic mean radius (denoted R_{1}) to be

$$R_1 = \frac{2a+b}{3}.$$

The factor of two accounts for the biaxial symmetry in Earth's spheroid, a specialization of triaxial ellipsoid. For Earth, the arithmetic mean radius is published by IUGG and NGA as 6,371.0087714 km (3,958.7613160 mi).

=== Authalic radius ===
Earth's authalic radius (meaning "equal area") is the radius of a hypothetical perfect sphere that has the same surface area as the reference ellipsoid. The IUGG denotes the authalic radius as R_{2}. A closed-form solution exists for a spheroid:

$$R_2
=\sqrt{\frac12\left(a^2+\frac{b^2}{e}\ln{\frac{1+e}{b/a}} \right) }
=\sqrt{\frac{a^2}2+\frac{b^2}2\frac{\tanh^{-1}e}e}
=\sqrt{\frac{A}{4\pi}},$$

where $\textstyle e = \sqrt{a^2 - b^2}\big/a$ is the eccentricity, and $A$ is the surface area of the spheroid.

For the Earth, the authalic radius is 6,371.0072 km (3,958.7603 mi).

The authalic radius $R_2$ also corresponds to the radius of (global) mean curvature, obtained by averaging the Gaussian curvature, $K$, over the surface of the ellipsoid. Using the Gauss–Bonnet theorem, this gives

$$\frac{\int K \,dA}{A} = \frac{4\pi}{A} = \frac{1}{R_2^2}.$$

=== Volumetric radius ===
Another spherical model is defined by the Earth's volumetric radius, which is the radius of a sphere of volume equal to the ellipsoid. The IUGG denotes the volumetric radius as R_{3}.

$$R_3 = \sqrt[3]{a^2b}.$$

For Earth, the volumetric radius equals 6,371.0008 km (3,958.7564 mi).

=== Rectifying radius ===
Another global radius is the Earth's rectifying radius, giving a sphere with circumference equal to the perimeter of the ellipse described by any polar cross section of the ellipsoid. This requires an elliptic integral to find, given the polar and equatorial radii:

$$M_\text{r} = \frac{2}{\pi} \int_0^{\frac{\pi}{2}} \sqrt{a^2 \cos^2\varphi + b^2 \sin^2\varphi} \,d\varphi.$$

The rectifying radius is equivalent to the meridional mean, which is defined as the average value of M:

$$M_\text{r} = \frac{2}{\pi} \int_0^{\frac{\pi}{2}} M(\varphi) \,d\varphi.$$

For integration limits of [0,π/2], the integrals for rectifying radius and mean radius evaluate to the same result, which, for Earth, amounts to 6,367.4491 km (3,956.5494 mi).

The meridional mean is well approximated by the semicubic mean of the two axes,

$$M_\text{r} \approx \left(\frac{a^\frac32 + b^\frac32}{2}\right)^\frac23,$$

which differs from the exact result by less than 1 μm (4×10^{−5} in); the mean of the two axes,

$$M_\text{r} \approx \frac{a + b}{2},$$

about 6,367.445 km (3,956.547 mi), can also be used.

== Topographical radii ==
The mathematical expressions above apply over the surface of the ellipsoid. The cases below considers Earth's topography, above or below a reference ellipsoid. As such, they are topographical geocentric distances, R_{t}, which depends not only on latitude.

=== Topographical extremes ===
- Maximum R_{t}: the summit of Chimborazo is 6,384.4 km (3,967.1 mi) from the Earth's center.
- Minimum R_{t}: the floor of the Arctic Ocean is 6,352.8 km (3,947.4 mi) from the Earth's center.

=== Topographical global mean ===
The topographical mean geocentric distance averages elevations everywhere, resulting in a value 230 m larger than the IUGG mean radius, the authalic radius, or the volumetric radius. This topographical average is 6,371.230 km (3,958.899 mi) with uncertainty of 10 m (33 ft).

== Derived quantities: diameter, circumference, arc-length, area, volume ==
Earth's diameter is simply twice Earth's radius; for example, equatorial diameter (2a) and polar diameter (2b). For the WGS84 ellipsoid, that's respectively:

2a = 12,756.2740 km (7,926.3812 mi),
2b = 12,713.5046 km (7,899.8055 mi).

Earth's circumference equals the perimeter length. The equatorial circumference is simply the circle perimeter: C_{e} = 2πa, in terms of the equatorial radius a:

C_{e} = 40,075.0167 km (24,901.461 mi)

The polar circumference equals C_{p} = 4m_{p}, four times the quarter meridian m_{p} = aE(e):

C_{p} = 40,007.8629173 km (24,859.733 mi)

The polar radius b enters via the eccentricity e = (1 − b^{2}/a^{2})^{0.5}; see Ellipse#Circumference for details.

Arc length of more general surface curves, such as meridian arcs and geodesics, can also be derived from Earth's equatorial and polar radii.

Likewise for surface area, either based on a map projection or a geodesic polygon.

Earth's volume, or that of the reference ellipsoid, is $V = \tfrac{4}{3}\pi a^2 b.$ Using the parameters from WGS84 ellipsoid of revolution, a = 6,378.137 km and b = 6356.7523142 km, it results in:

V = 1.08321×10^{12} km^{3} (2.5988×10^{11} mi^{3})

== Nominal radii ==
In astronomy, the International Astronomical Union denotes the nominal equatorial Earth radius as $\mathcal{R}^\text{N}_\text{eE}$, which is defined to be exactly 6,378.1 km (3,963.2 mi). The nominal polar Earth radius is defined exactly as $\mathcal{R}^\text{N}_\text{pE}$ = 6,356.8 km (3,949.9 mi). These values correspond to the zero Earth tide convention. Equatorial radius is conventionally used as the nominal value unless the polar radius is explicitly required. The nominal radius serves as a unit of length for astronomy. (The notation is defined such that it can be easily generalized for other planets; e.g., $\mathcal{R}^\text{N}_\text{pJ}$ for the nominal polar Jupiter radius.)

== Published values ==
This table summarizes the accepted values of the Earth's radius.

Agency	Description	Value (in meters)	Ref.
IAU	nominal "zero tide" equatorial	6378100	
IAU	nominal "zero tide" polar	6356800	
IUGG	equatorial radius	6378137	
IUGG	semiminor axis (b)	6356752.3141	
IUGG	polar radius of curvature (c)	6399593.6259	
IUGG	mean radius (R_{1})	6371008.7714	
IUGG	radius of sphere of same surface (R_{2})	6371007.1810	
IUGG	radius of sphere of same volume (R_{3})	6371000.7900	
NGA	WGS-84 ellipsoid, semi-major axis (a)	6378137.0	
NGA	WGS-84 ellipsoid, semi-minor axis (b)	6356752.3142	
NGA	WGS-84 ellipsoid, polar radius of curvature (c)	6399593.6258	
NGA	WGS-84 ellipsoid, Mean radius of semi-axes (R_{1})	6371008.7714	
NGA	WGS-84 ellipsoid, Radius of Sphere of Equal Area (R_{2})	6371007.1809	
NGA	WGS-84 ellipsoid, Radius of Sphere of Equal Volume (R_{3})	6371000.7900	
	GRS 80 semi-major axis (a)	6378137.0	
	GRS 80 semi-minor axis (b)	≈6356752.314140	
	Spherical Earth Approx. of Radius (R_{E})	6366707.0195	
	meridional radius of curvature at the equator	6335439	
	Maximum (the summit of Chimborazo)	6384400	
	Minimum (the floor of the Arctic Ocean)	6352800	
	Average distance from center to surface	6371230±10	

== History ==
The first published reference to the Earth's size appeared around 350 BC, when Aristotle reported in his book On the Heavens that mathematicians had guessed the circumference of the Earth to be 400,000 stadia. Scholars have interpreted Aristotle's figure to be anywhere from highly accurate to almost double the true value. The first known scientific measurement and calculation of the circumference of the Earth was performed by Eratosthenes in about 240 BC. Estimates of the error of Eratosthenes's measurement range from 0.5% to 17%. For both Aristotle and Eratosthenes, uncertainty in the accuracy of their estimates is due to modern uncertainty over which stadion length they meant.

Around 100 BC, Posidonius of Apamea recomputed Earth's radius, and found it to be close to that by Eratosthenes, but later Strabo incorrectly attributed him a value about 3/4 of the actual size. Claudius Ptolemy around 150 AD gave empirical evidence supporting a spherical Earth, but he accepted the lesser value attributed to Posidonius. His highly influential work, the Almagest, left no doubt among medieval scholars that Earth is spherical, but they were wrong about its size.

By 1490, Christopher Columbus believed that traveling 3,000 miles west from the west coast of the Iberian Peninsula would let him reach the eastern coasts of Asia. However, the 1492 enactment of that voyage brought his fleet to the Americas. The Magellan expedition (1519–1522), which was the first circumnavigation of the World, soundly demonstrated the sphericity of the Earth, and affirmed the original measurement of 40,000 km (25,000 mi) by Eratosthenes.

Around 1690, Isaac Newton and Christiaan Huygens argued that Earth was closer to an oblate spheroid than to a sphere. However, around 1730, Jacques Cassini argued for a prolate spheroid instead, due to different interpretations of the Newtonian mechanics involved. To settle the matter, the French Geodesic Mission (1735–1739) measured one degree of latitude at two locations, one near the Arctic Circle and the other near the equator. The expedition found that Newton's conjecture was correct: the Earth is flattened at the poles due to rotation's centrifugal force.

== See also ==
- Earth ellipsoid
- Earth mass
- Earth's circumference
- Effective Earth radius
- Geodesy
- Geographical distance
- History of geodesy
- Planetary radius
- Timeline of Earth estimates
