= Tilla (disambiguation) =

Tilla may refer to:

== People ==
- Tilla Durieux (1880–1971), Austrian actor
- Tilla Valstad (1871–1957), Norwegian teacher, novelist, and journalist
- Tilla Weinstein (1934–2002), American mathematician

== Places ==
- Tilla Test Firing Range (TTFR) in Pakistan
- Tilla Jogian, Hindu temple in Pakistan

== Other ==
- Tilla (deity), bull-god in the Hittite pantheon
