= Euler's theorem (differential geometry) =

Orthogonality of the directions of the principal curvatures of a surface

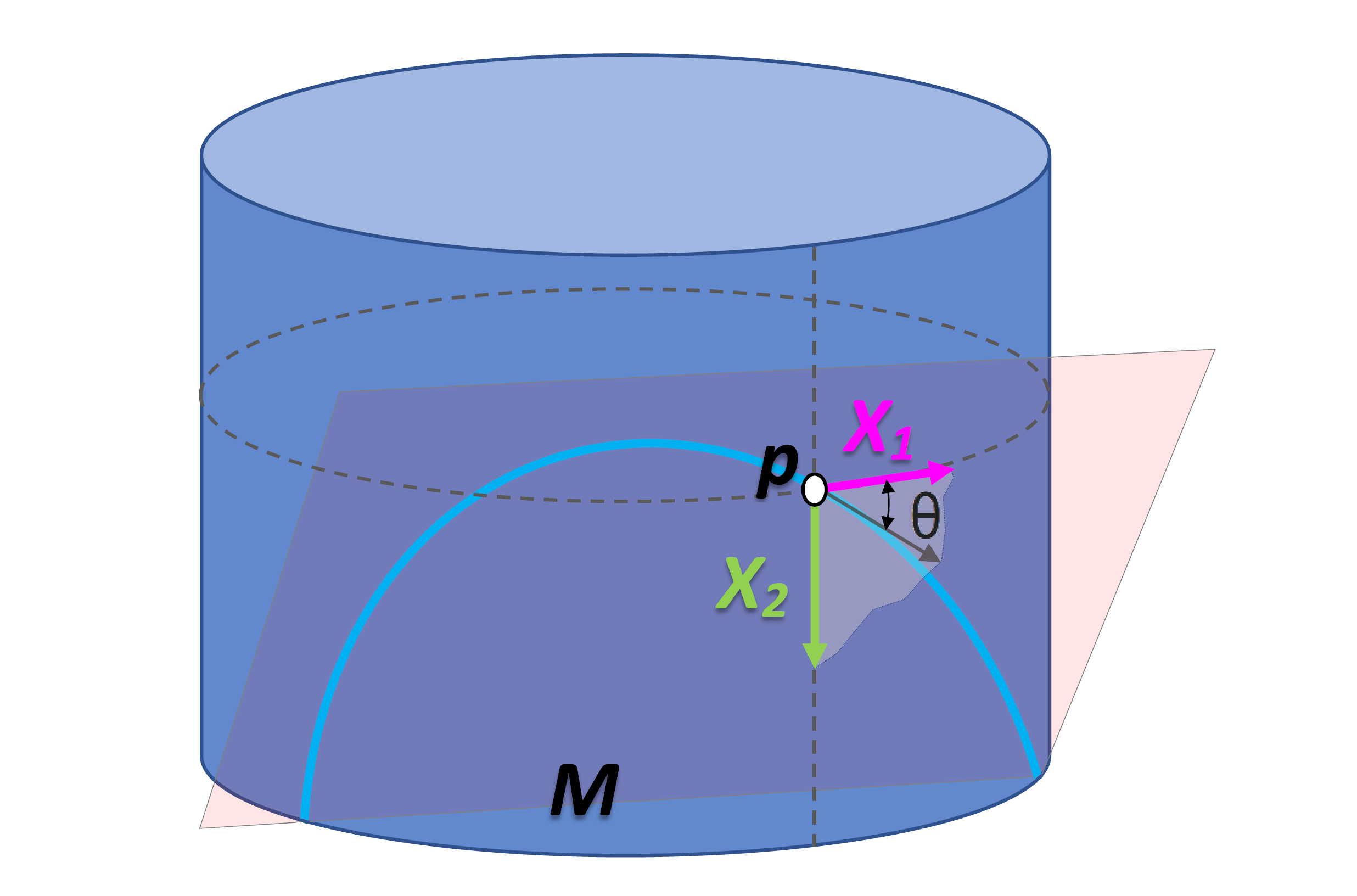

In differential geometry, Euler's theorem is a result on the curvature of curves on a surface. The theorem establishes the existence of principal curvatures and associated principal directions which give the directions in which the surface curves the most and the least. The theorem is named for Leonhard Euler who proved the theorem in (Euler 1760).

More precisely, let M be a surface in three-dimensional Euclidean space, and p a point on M. A normal plane through p is a plane passing through the point p containing the normal vector to M. Through each (unit) tangent vector to M at p, there passes a normal plane P_{X} which cuts out a curve in M. That curve has a certain curvature κ_{X} when regarded as a curve inside P_{X}. Provided not all κ_{X} are equal, there is some unit vector X_{1} for which k_{1} = κ_{X_{1}} is as large as possible, and another unit vector X_{2} for which k_{2} = κ_{X_{2}} is as small as possible. Euler's theorem asserts that X_{1} and X_{2} are perpendicular and that, moreover, if X is any vector making an angle θ with X_{1}, then

$\kappa_X = k_1\cos^2\theta + k_2\sin^2\theta.\,$	1

The quantities k_{1} and k_{2} are called the principal curvatures, and X_{1} and X_{2} are the corresponding principal directions. Equation (1) is sometimes called Euler's equation (Eisenhart 2004, p. 124).

== See also ==
- Differential geometry of surfaces
- Dupin indicatrix
- Earth azimuthal radius of curvature
