= Normal plane =

A normal plane may refer to

- The plane perpendicular to the tangent vector of a space curve; see Frenet–Serret formulas.
- One of the planes containing the normal vector of a surface; see Normal plane (geometry).
- A term involving gears; see list of gear nomenclature.

== See also ==
- Normal bundle
- Normal section
