= Hans Hamburger =

German mathematician

Hans Ludwig Hamburger (5 August 1889, Berlin – 14 August 1956, Cologne) was a German mathematician. He was a professor at the Friedrich Wilhelm University of Berlin, the University of Cologne, and Ankara University.

== Biography ==
Hans was the elder son of Karl Hamburger and Margarethe Levy. He was of Jewish heritage, but baptised as a protestant. His father was a lawyer and mixed in learned circles in Berlin. Hans attended the Royal French Gymnasium in Berlin from 1898 to 1907. Hamburger obtained his Ph.D. from the Ludwig-Maximilians-Universität München in 1914 under the supervision of Alfred Pringsheim and after war service obtained his Habilitation for a thesis on Extensions of the Stieltjes moment problem. He was appointed Privatdozent at the Friedrich Wilhelm University of Berlin in 1921 and professor at the University of Cologne in 1926. He left Cologne in 1935, after the imposition of the Nuremberg Laws, and returned to his mother's home in Berlin. In 1939, he left Germany, and from 1941 to 1946 he was lecturer at the University of Southampton. After the war, he received an invitation to return to the University of Cologne, but instead moved to Ankara University in 1947. He returned to Cologne in 1953.

He was married briefly twice, to Malla Jessen in 1927 and to Vera Schereschevsky two months prior to his death in 1956.

== Research ==
The main results from Hamburger's pre-war research concerned the Hamburger moment problem, which is named after him, and his work on the Carathéodory conjecture, beginning in Berlin in 1922. His work on this topic was published only 20 years later, a reflection of the difficulty of the problem. He attributed the conjecture to Carathéodory and his approach was a reformulation of the conjecture in terms of a bound on the index of an isolated umbilic point of a surface. His attribution remains in place today, and his solution of the Carathéodory conjecture in the real analytic case is regarded as complete. He also proved a converse theorem for the Riemann zeta function.

After the war, Hamburger's research primarily concerned linear transformations of Hilbert space. Hamburger published the textbook, Linear Transformations in n-Dimensional Vector Space. An Introduction to the Theory of Hilbert Space (1951) with Margaret Grimshaw.
