= Margaret Grimshaw =

English mathematician (1905–1990)

Margaret Eleanor Grimshaw (1905–1990) was a mathematician and academic at the University of Cambridge.

== Early life ==
Margaret Eleanor Grimshaw was born on 17 January 1905 in Elland, Yorkshire. Her parents were school teachers, with her father being headmaster at Southowram School in Halifax in 1918. Grimshaw attended Barnsley High School and Halifax Girls Secondary School.

She took her B.A First Class in 1926 from Newnham College, the University of Cambridge. She continued with her research after graduation, residing in the Kennedy Building staff accommodation for much of her life. She had an opportunity to work with a number of Fellows as they moved through Cambridge, including Jean Mitchell, Edith Whetham, Joyce Salt, Dorothy Hill and many others. Grimshaw was Mary Ewart Scholar 1924–1926, Arthur Clough Scholar 1926–1927 and Marion Kennedy Residential Student from 1927 to 1928. She took her M.A. in 1930.

== Career ==
Grimshaw was Assistant Lecturer in Mathematics from 1928 to 1930 and Associates Resident Fellow 1930–1933. She worked as a tutor at University of Göttingen and temporary tutor at Oxford University from 1933 to 1934, before joining the staff of Cambridge as a lecturer. This appointment lasted from 1934 to 1958. She was Director of Studies in Mathematics from 1936 to 1958. Her work was in pure mathematics, in particular analysis. Early papers were on integration theory, Fourier series and transforms. She wrote a textbook with Hans Hamburger in 1951, Linear Transformations in n-Dimensional Vector Space. An Introduction to the Theory of Hilbert Space. She published in mathematics journals.

Grimshaw was on the Council of Newnham College from 1936 to 1968. She was Vice Principal from 1953 until 1958, when she became Bursar of Newnham College. At this time she stepped away from teaching duties. Her fulfilled the Bursar role until 1968. She maintained the Newnham Roll or register of the students who had graduated from the College from 1971 to 1980.

Grimshaw died in 1990 in Cambridge.

== Legacy ==
Grimshaw bequeathed to Cambridge a large number of school prizes and medals, which she had collected in her lifetime. They are held by the Fitzwilliam Museum in Cambridge.
