= Ridge (differential geometry) =

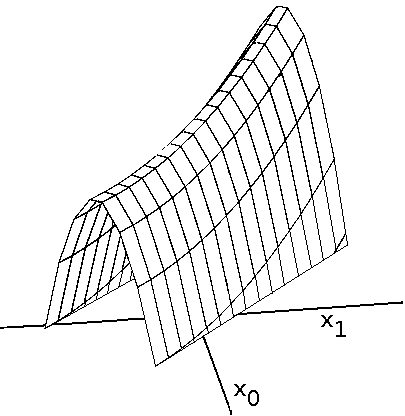
A ridge

In differential geometry, a smooth surface in three dimensions has a ridge point when a line of curvature has a local maximum or minimum of principal curvature. The set of ridge points form curves on the surface called ridges.

The ridges of a given surface fall into two families, typically designated red and blue, depending on which of the two principal curvatures has an extremum.

At umbilical points the colour of a ridge will change from red to blue. There are two main cases: one has three ridge lines passing through the umbilic, and the other has one line passing through it.

Ridge lines correspond to cuspidal edges on the focal surface.

== See also ==
- Ridge detection
