= Umbilical point =

Locally spherical point on a mathematical surface

Lines of curvature on an ellipsoid showing umbilic points (red).

In the differential geometry of surfaces in three dimensions, umbilics or umbilical points are points on a surface that are locally spherical. At such points the normal curvatures in all directions are equal, hence, both principal curvatures are equal, and every tangent vector is a principal direction. The name "umbilic" comes from the Latin umbilicus (navel).

Umbilic points generally occur as isolated points in the elliptical region of the surface; that is, where the Gaussian curvature is positive.

The sphere is the only surface with non-zero curvature where every point is umbilic. A flat umbilic is an umbilic with zero Gaussian curvature. The monkey saddle is an example of a surface with a flat umbilic and on the plane every point is a flat umbilic. A closed surface topologically equivalent to a torus may or may not have zero umbilics, but every closed surface of nonzero Euler characteristic, embedded smoothly into Euclidean space, has at least one umbilic. A famous conjecture of Constantin Carathéodory dating from 1924 states that every smooth surface topologically equivalent to the sphere has at least two umbilics. The Conjecture was proven by Brendan Guilfoyle and Wilhelm Klingenberg and published in three parts concluding in 2024, the centenary of the Conjecture.

The three main types of umbilic points are elliptical umbilics, parabolic umbilics and hyperbolic umbilics. Elliptical umbilics have the three ridge lines passing through the umbilic and hyperbolic umbilics have just one. Parabolic umbilics are a transitional case with two ridges one of which is singular. Other configurations are possible for transitional cases. These cases correspond to the D_{4}^{−}, D_{5} and D_{4}^{+} elementary catastrophes of René Thom's catastrophe theory. The elliptical and the hyperbolic are structurally stable, but the parabolic is not, since it can be destroyed under small perturbations.

Umbilics can also be characterised by the pattern of the principal direction vector field around the umbilic which typically form one of three configurations: star, lemon, and lemonstar (or monstar). The index of the vector field is either −½ (star) or ½ (lemon, monstar). Elliptical and parabolic umbilics always have the star pattern, whilst hyperbolic umbilics can be star, lemon, or monstar. This classification was first due to Darboux and the names come from Hannay.

For surfaces with genus 0 with isolated umbilics, e.g. an ellipsoid, the index of the principal direction vector field must be 2 by the Poincaré–Hopf theorem. Generic genus 0 surfaces have at least four umbilics of index ½. An ellipsoid of revolution has two non-generic umbilics each of which has index 1, which may split to two hyperbolic umbilic lemons under perturbation.

configurations of lines of curvature near umbilics

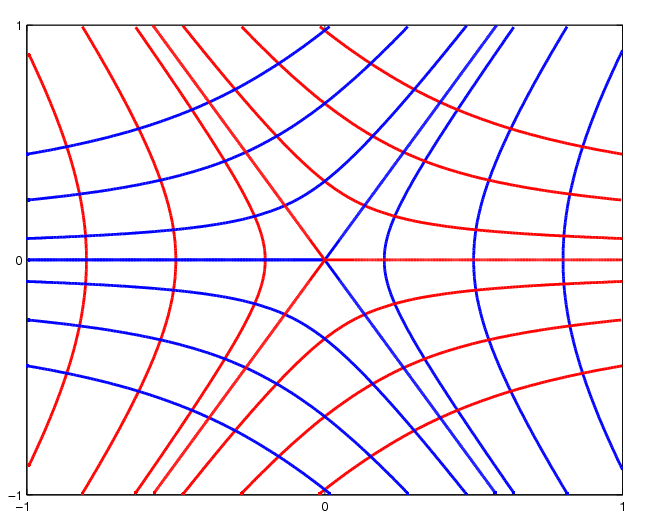
Star (any umbilic)

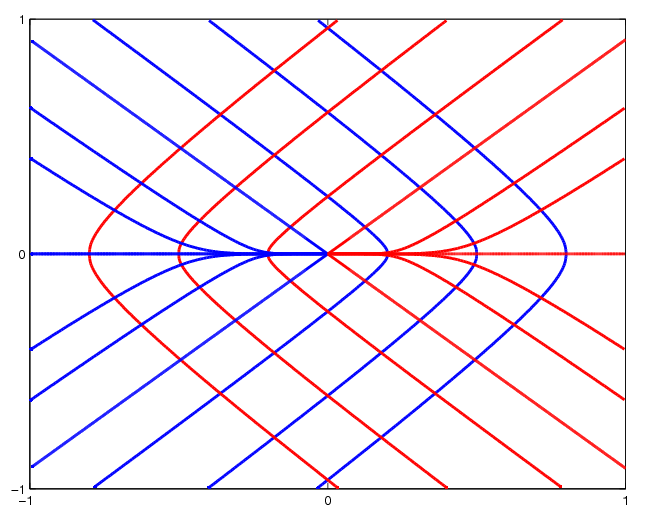
Monstar (hyperbolic umbilic)

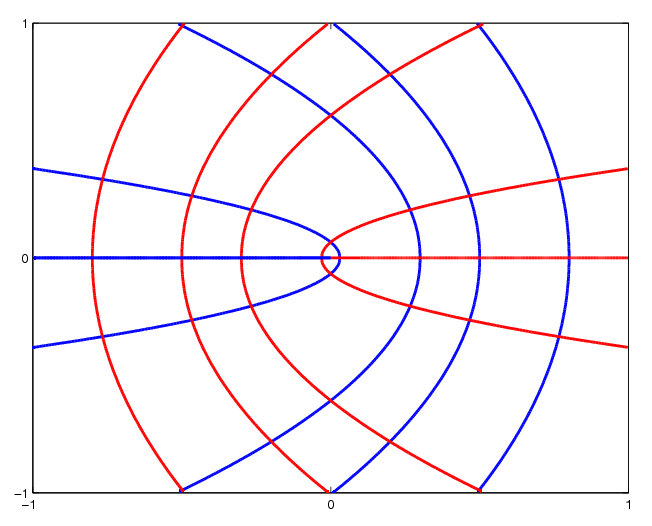
Lemon (hyperbolic umbilic)

== Classification of umbilics ==
=== Cubic forms ===
The classification of umbilics is closely linked to the classification of real cubic forms $a x^3 + 3 b x^2 y + 3 c x y^2 + d y^3$. A cubic form will have a number of root lines $\lambda (x,y)$ such that the cubic form is zero for all real $\lambda$. There are a number of possibilities including:

- Three distinct lines: an elliptical cubic form, standard model $x^2 y-y^3$.
- Three lines, two of which are coincident: a parabolic cubic form, standard model $x^2 y$.
- A single real line: a hyperbolic cubic form, standard model $x^2 y+y^3$.
- Three coincident lines, standard model $x^3$.

The equivalence classes of such cubics under uniform scaling form a three-dimensional real projective space and the subset of parabolic forms define a surface – called the umbilic bracelet by Christopher Zeeman. Taking equivalence classes under rotation of the coordinate system removes one further parameter and a cubic forms can be represent by the complex cubic form $z^3+3 \overline{\beta} z^2 \overline{z} + 3 \beta z \overline{z}^2 + \overline{z}^3$ with a single complex parameter $\beta$. Parabolic forms occur when $\beta=\tfrac{1}{3}(2 e^{i\theta}+e^{-2 i\theta})$, the inner deltoid, elliptical forms are inside the deltoid and hyperbolic one outside. If $\left |\beta\right |=1$ and $\beta$ is not a cube root of unity then the cubic form is a right-angled cubic form which play a special role for umbilics. If $\left |\beta\right |=\tfrac{1}{3}$ then two of the root lines are orthogonal.

A second cubic form, the Jacobian is formed by taking the Jacobian determinant of the vector valued function $F : \mathbb{R}^2 \rightarrow \mathbb{R}^2$, $F(x,y)=(x^2+y^2,a x^3 + 3 b x^2 y + 3 c x y^2 + d y^3)$. Up to a constant multiple this is the cubic form $b x^3+(2 c-a)x^2 y+(d-2 b)x y^2-c y^3$. Using complex numbers the Jacobian is a parabolic cubic form when $\beta=-2 e^{i\theta}-e^{-2 i\theta}$, the outer deltoid in the classification diagram.

=== Umbilic classification ===
Umbilic classification, the $\beta$—plane. The Inner deltoid give parabolic umbilics, separates elliptical and hyperbolic umbilics. Cusps on inner deltoid: cubic umbilics. Outer circle, the birth of umbilics separates star and monstar configurations. Outer deltoid, separates monstar and lemon configuration. Diagonals and the horizontal line - symmetrical umbilics with mirror symmetry.

Any surface with an isolated umbilic point at the origin can be expressed as a Monge form parameterisation $z=\tfrac{1}{2}\kappa(x^2+y^2)+\tfrac{1}{3}(a x^3 + 3 b x^2 y + 3 c x y^2 + d y^3)+\ldots$, where $\kappa$ is the unique principal curvature. The type of umbilic is classified by the cubic form from the cubic part and corresponding Jacobian cubic form. Whilst principal directions are not uniquely defined at an umbilic the limits of the principal directions when following a ridge on the surface can be found and these correspond to the root-lines of the cubic form. The pattern of lines of curvature is determined by the Jacobian.

The classification of umbilic points is as follows:

- Inside inner deltoid - elliptical umbilics
  - On inner circle - two ridge lines tangent
- On inner deltoid - parabolic umbilics
- Outside inner deltoid - hyperbolic umbilics
  - Inside outer circle - star pattern
  - On outer circle - birth of umbilics
  - Between outer circle and outer deltoid - monstar pattern
  - Outside outer deltoid - lemon pattern
- Cusps of the inner deltoid - cubic (symbolic) umbilics
- On the diagonals and the horizontal line - symmetrical umbilics with mirror symmetry

In a generic family of surfaces umbilics can be created, or destroyed, in pairs: the birth of umbilics transition. Both umbilics will be hyperbolic, one with a star pattern and one with a monstar pattern. The outer circle in the diagram, a right angle cubic form, gives these transitional cases. Symbolic umbilics are a special case of this.

== Focal surface ==
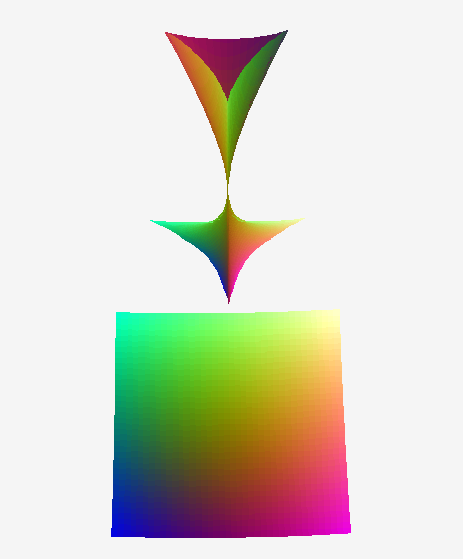
A surface with an elliptical umbilic, and its focal surface.

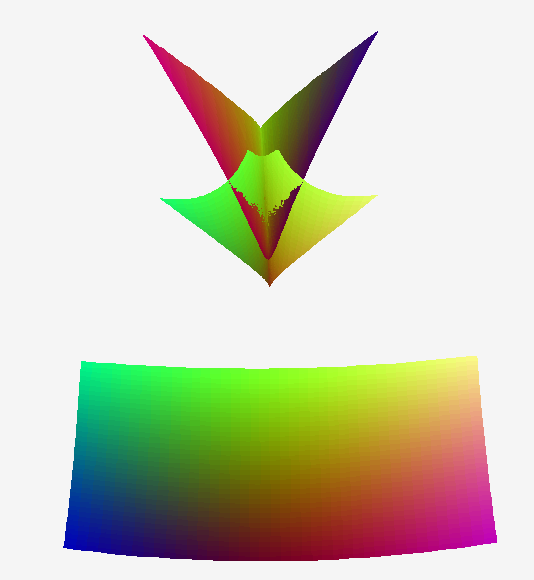
A surface with a hyperbolic umbilic and its focal surface.

The elliptical umbilics and hyperbolic umbilics have distinctly different focal surfaces. A ridge on the surface corresponds to a cuspidal edges so each sheet of the elliptical focal surface will have three cuspidal edges which come together at the umbilic focus and then switch to the other sheet. For a hyperbolic umbilic there is a single cuspidal edge which switch from one sheet to the other.

== Definition in higher dimension in Riemannian manifolds ==
A point p in a Riemannian submanifold is umbilical if, at p, the (vector-valued) Second fundamental form is some normal vector tensor the induced metric (First fundamental form). Equivalently, for all vectors U, V at p, II(U, V) = g_{p}(U, V)$\nu$, where $\nu$ is the mean curvature vector at p.

A submanifold is said to be umbilic (or all-umbilic) if this condition holds at every point p. This is equivalent to saying that the submanifold can be made totally geodesic by an appropriate conformal change of the metric of the surrounding (“ambient”) manifold. For example, a surface in Euclidean space is umbilic if and only if it is a piece of a sphere.

== See also ==
- umbilical – an anatomical term meaning of, or relating to the navel
