= Principal curvature =

Maximal and minimal curvature at a point of a surface

Saddle surface with normal planes in directions of principal curvatures

In differential geometry, the two principal curvatures at a given point of a surface are the maximum and minimum values of the curvature as expressed by the eigenvalues of the shape operator at that point. They measure how the surface bends by different amounts in different directions at that point.

== Discussion ==
At each point p of a differentiable surface in 3-dimensional Euclidean space one may choose a unit normal vector. A normal plane at p is one that contains the normal vector, and will therefore also contain a unique direction tangent to the surface and cut the surface in a plane curve, called normal section. This curve will in general have different curvatures for different normal planes at p. The principal curvatures at p, denoted k_{1} and k_{2}, are the maximum and minimum values of this curvature.

Here the curvature of a curve is by definition the reciprocal of the radius of the osculating circle. The curvature is taken to be positive if the curve turns in the same direction as the surface's chosen normal, and otherwise negative. The directions in the normal plane where the curvature takes its maximum and minimum values are always perpendicular, if k_{1} does not equal k_{2}, a result of Euler (1760), and are called principal directions. From a modern perspective, this theorem follows from the spectral theorem because these directions are as the principal axes of a symmetric tensor—the second fundamental form. A systematic analysis of the principal curvatures and principal directions was undertaken by Gaston Darboux, using Darboux frames.

The product k_{1}k_{2} of the two principal curvatures is the Gaussian curvature, K, and the average (k_{1} + k_{2})/2 is the mean curvature, H.

If at least one of the principal curvatures is zero at every point, then the Gaussian curvature will be 0 and the surface is a developable surface. For a minimal surface, the mean curvature is zero at every point.

== Formal definition ==
Let M be a surface in Euclidean space with second fundamental form $I\!I(X,Y)$. Fix a point p ∈ M, and an orthonormal basis X_{1}, X_{2} of tangent vectors at p. Then the principal curvatures are the eigenvalues of the symmetric matrix

$$\left[I\!I_{ij}\right] =
\begin{bmatrix}
I\!I(X_1,X_1)&I\!I(X_1,X_2)\\
I\!I(X_2,X_1)&I\!I(X_2,X_2)
\end{bmatrix}.$$

If X_{1} and X_{2} are selected so that the matrix $\left[I\!I_{ij}\right]$ is a diagonal matrix, then they are called the principal directions. If the surface is oriented, then one often requires that the pair (X_{1}, X_{2}) be positively oriented with respect to the given orientation.

Without reference to a particular orthonormal basis, the principal curvatures are the eigenvalues of the shape operator, and the principal directions are its eigenvectors.

=== Generalizations ===
For hypersurfaces in higher-dimensional Euclidean spaces, the principal curvatures may be defined in a directly analogous fashion. The principal curvatures are the eigenvalues of the matrix of the second fundamental form $I\!I(X_i,X_j)$ in an orthonormal basis of the tangent space. The principal directions are the corresponding eigenvectors.

Similarly, if M is a hypersurface in a Riemannian manifold N, then the principal curvatures are the eigenvalues of its second-fundamental form. If k_{1}, ..., k_{n} are the n principal curvatures at a point p ∈ M and X_{1}, ..., X_{n} are corresponding orthonormal eigenvectors (principal directions), then the sectional curvature of M at p is given by

$$K(X_i,X_j) = k_ik_j$$

for all $i,j$ with $i\neq j$.

== Classification of points on a surface ==
- At elliptical points, both principal curvatures have the same sign, and the surface is locally convex.
  - At umbilic points, both principal curvatures are equal and every tangent vector can be considered a principal direction. These typically occur in isolated points.
- At hyperbolic points, the principal curvatures have opposite signs, and the surface will be locally saddle shaped.
- At parabolic points, one of the principal curvatures is zero. Parabolic points generally lie in a curve separating elliptical and hyperbolic regions.
  - At flat umbilic points both principal curvatures are zero. A generic surface will not contain flat umbilic points. The monkey saddle is one surface with an isolated flat umbilic.

Surface point classes
		k_{1}		
		< 0	= 0	> 0
k_{2}	< 0	Concave ellipsoid	Concave cylinder	Hyperboloid surface
k_{2}	= 0	Concave cylinder	Plane	Convex cylinder
k_{2}	> 0	Hyperboloid surface	Convex cylinder	Convex ellipsoid

== Line of curvature ==
The lines of curvature or curvature lines are curves which are always tangent to a principal direction (they are integral curves for the principal direction fields). There will be two lines of curvature through each non-umbilic point and the lines will cross at right angles. They were first studied by Gaspard Monge in the context of the optimal transport problem in $\R^3$, and in the context of engineering. In a course of lectures given in 1795, Monge proposed that the legislative assembly for the government of the French Revolution should be a triaxial ellipsoidal dome. The lines of curvature are the guiding curves for the workers to put the stones. The candle lights hang from the two umbilic points. Straight below one umbilic point would be the podium for the speakers. The square-shaped holes between the curves can also be windows, a shape much more rational than the rose windows of gothic churches.

In the vicinity of an umbilic the lines of curvature typically form one of three configurations star, lemon and monstar (derived from lemon-star). These points are also called Darbouxian Umbilics (D_{1}, D_{2}, D_{3}) in honor of Gaston Darboux, the first to make a systematic study in Vol. 4, p 455, of his Leçons (1896).

Configurations of lines of curvature near umbilics

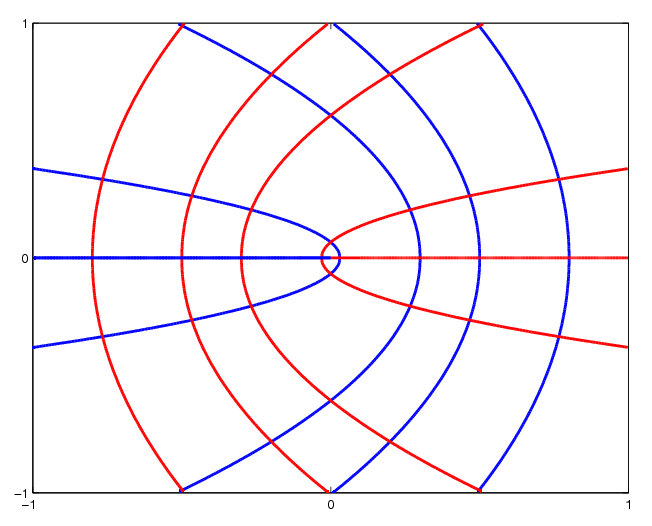
Lemon - D_{1}

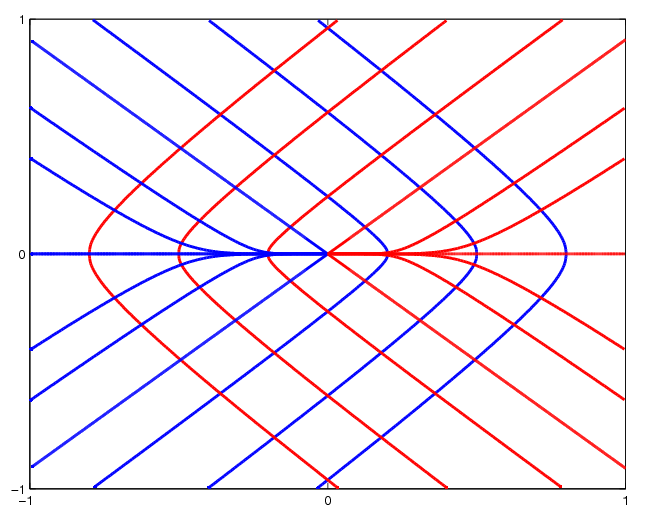
Monstar - D_{2}

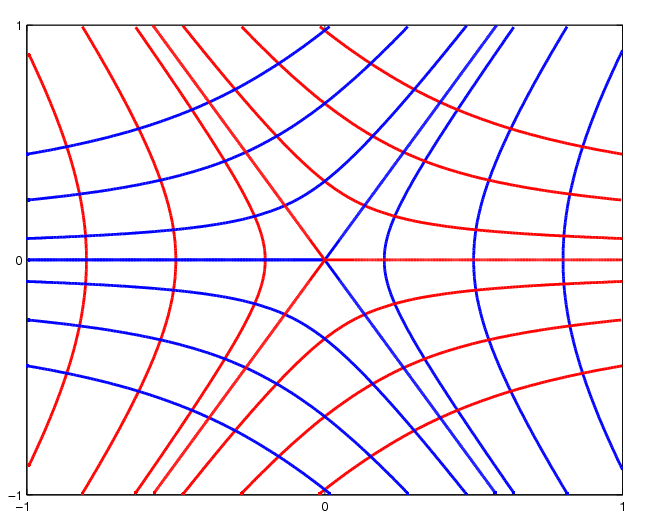
Star - D_{3}

In these figures, the red curves are the lines of curvature for one family of principal directions, and the blue curves for the other.

When a line of curvature has a local extremum of the same principal curvature then the curve has a ridge point. These ridge points form curves on the surface called ridges. The ridge curves pass through the umbilics. For the star pattern either 3 or 1 ridge line pass through the umbilic, for the monstar and lemon only one ridge passes through.

== Applications ==
Principal curvature directions, along with the surface normal, define a 3D orientation frame at a surface point. For example, on a cylinder, along a certain unit vector, the surface is flat (parallel to the axis of the cylinder). The implication of such an orientation frame at each surface point means any rotation of the surfaces over time can be determined simply by considering the change in the corresponding orientation frames. This has resulted in single surface point motion estimation and segmentation algorithms in computer vision.

== See also ==
- Earth radius#Principal sections
- Euler's theorem (differential geometry)
