= Normal plane (geometry) =

Geometric plane containing the normal vector of a given surface

Saddle surface with normal planes in directions of principal curvatures.

In geometry, a normal plane is any plane containing the normal vector of a surface at a particular point.

The normal plane also refers to the plane that is perpendicular to the tangent vector of a space curve; (this plane also contains the normal vector) see Frenet–Serret formulas.

== Normal section ==
The normal section of a surface at a particular point is the curve produced by the intersection of that surface with a normal plane.

The curvature of the normal section is called the normal curvature. If the surface is bow or cylinder shaped, the maximum and the minimum of these curvatures are the principal curvatures. If the surface is saddle shaped the maxima of both sides are the principal curvatures. The product of the principal curvatures is the Gaussian curvature of the surface (negative for saddle shaped surfaces). The mean of the principal curvatures is the mean curvature of the surface; if (and only if) the mean curvature is zero, the surface is called a minimal surface.

== See also ==
- Earth normal section
- Normal bundle
- Normal curvature
- Osculating plane
- Principal curvature
- Tangent plane (geometry)
