= Tilla Weinstein =

American mathematician

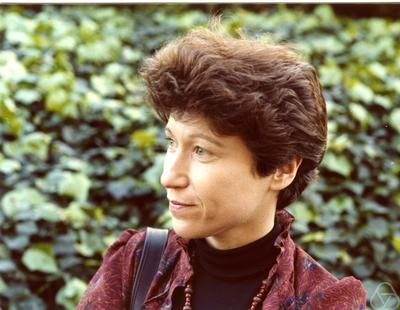
Weinstein in Berkeley, 1981

Tilla Weinstein (1934–2002, née Savanuck, also published as Tilla Klotz and Tilla K. Milnor) was an American mathematician known for her mentorship of younger women in mathematics. Her research concerned differential geometry, including conformal structures, harmonic maps, and Lorentz surfaces. She taught for many years at Rutgers University, where she headed the mathematics department in the Douglass Residential College.

== Early life and education ==
Weinstein was born as Tilla Savanuck, in 1934. Her father was a Russian immigrant and lawyer in New York City; her mother was a legal secretary. She began her undergraduate studies in 1951 as an English major at the University of Michigan, in part to get away from her parents' rocky marriage and to live near relatives in Detroit. There, her courses included calculus from Hans Samelson and a course in the foundations of mathematics from Raymond Louis Wilder.

After her first year in Michigan, she became engaged to an English student she knew in New York, and after her second year (in 1953), she married him and returned to New York. Not wishing to repeat her earlier coursework (as she would if she had transferred to the City College of New York), she became a mathematics undergraduate student at New York University. She was the only woman in the program at the time. After her marriage, she used the name Tilla Klotz for her publications, a name she would continue to use until the late 1960s.

At NYU, her calculus instructor, Jean van Heijenoort, noted her ability, encouraged her to participate in the school's team for the William Lowell Putnam Mathematical Competition, and led her to take advanced classes in mathematics, including a class in complex analysis from Lipman Bers. In her first meeting with Bers, she announced her pregnancy, but Bers was supportive and helped her to complete her bachelor's degree "without undue delay", despite opposition from the dean of the school. She completed her Ph.D. in 1959 at NYU. Her dissertation, On G. Bol's Proof of Caratheodory's Conjecture, was supervised by Bers.

== Career and later life ==
Although Bers found a position for Weinstein at the University of California, Berkeley, she was unable to find a matching position for her husband, and declined the offer. With the assistance of Bers, she instead became a faculty member at the University of California, Los Angeles, and earned tenure there in 1966, the first woman to earn tenure in the mathematics department there.

After a "sudden and unexpected" divorce in the late 1960s, she married Princeton mathematician John Milnor (also recently divorced) in 1968, and changed her name on her publications to Tilla K. Milnor, a name she continued to use until 1991. She moved in 1969 to Boston College, in order to be less far from her husband, who was working in Princeton, New Jersey.

In 1970, Weinstein was hired by Rutgers University to become the chair of the mathematics department in the Douglass Residential College. She served as chair from 1970 to 1973, and a second term from 1978 to 1981, after which that department was merged into the main mathematics department at Rutgers.

In 1992, she married Kive Weinstein and changed her name again to Tilla Weinstein. She retired from Rutgers in 2000, and died on January 21, 2002.

== Selected publications ==
- Klotz, Tilla; Sario, Leo (1965), "Existence of complete minimal surfaces of arbitrary connectivity and genus", Proceedings of the National Academy of Sciences, 54 (1): 42–44, Bibcode:1965PNAS...54...42K, doi:10.1073/pnas.54.1.42, MR 0178408, PMC 285793, PMID 16591288
- Milnor, Tilla Klotz (1972), "Efimov's theorem about complete immersed surfaces of negative curvature", Advances in Mathematics, 8 (3): 474–543, doi:10.1016/0001-8708(72)90007-2, MR 0301679
- Milnor, Tilla Klotz (1982), "Characterizing harmonic immersions of surfaces with indefinite metric", Proceedings of the National Academy of Sciences, 79 (6): 2143–2144, Bibcode:1982PNAS...79.2143K, doi:10.1073/pnas.79.6.2143, MR 0648910, PMC 346142, PMID 16593177
- Milnor, Tilla Klotz (1983), "Harmonic maps and classical surface theory in Minkowski 3-space", Transactions of the American Mathematical Society, 280 (1): 161–185, doi:10.2307/1999607, JSTOR 1999607, MR 0712254
- Weinstein, Tilla (1996), An introduction to Lorentz surfaces, Berlin: De Gruyter, doi:10.1515/9783110821635, ISBN 3-11-014333-X

== Recognition ==
The Rutgers mathematics department offers an annual award for outstanding undergraduate achievement, the Tilla Weinstein Award, in her honor.
