= 1649 in science =

List of years in science	(table)
- … 1639; 1640; 1641; 1642; 1643; 1644; 1645; 1646; 1647; 1648; 1649; 1650; 1651; 1652; 1653; 1654; 1655; 1656; 1657; 1658; 1659 …
- Art; Archaeology; Architecture; Literature; Music; Philosophy; Science; +...

The year 1649 in science and technology involved some significant events.

== Biology ==
- Publication of John Jonston's Historiae naturalis in Frankfurt begins with De piscibus et cetis.

== Technology ==
- Johann Schröder publishes two methods for the production of elemental Arsenic.

== Mathematics ==
- Frans van Schooten publishes the first Latin version of René Descartes' La Géométrie. His commentary makes the work understandable to the broader mathematical community. The Latin version also includes Florimond de Beaune's Notes brièves, the first important introduction to Descartes' cartesian geometry.

== Events ==
- The semi-formal Oxford Philosophical Club of natural philosophers begins to meet; it is a predecessor of the Royal Society of London.

== Births ==
- March 3 – John Floyer, English physician (died 1734)

== Deaths ==
- September 6 – Robert Dudley, English-born navigator (born 1574)
