= Track transition curve =

Mathematically-calculated curve in which a straight section changes into a curve

The red Euler spiral is an example of an easement curve between a blue straight line and a circular arc, shown in green.

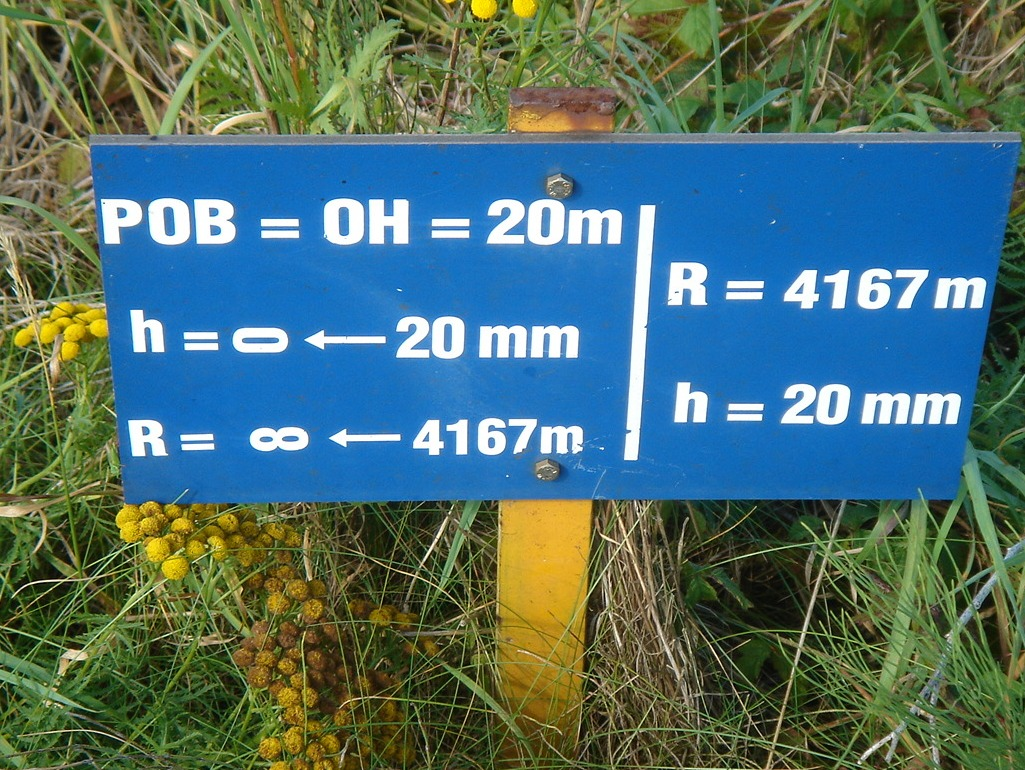
This sign aside a railroad (between Ghent and Bruges) indicates the start of the transition curve. A parabolic curve (POB) is used.

A transition curve (also, spiral easement or, simply, spiral) is a spiral-shaped length of highway or railroad track that is used between sections having different profiles and radii, such as between straightaways (tangents) and curves, or between two different curves.

Centripetal force on vehicles on roads without and with a transition curve

Straight sections of road connected directly by a circular arc.

Straight section connected to a circular arc via a Cornu spiral

Comparison of a road with no transition curve with the sudden application of centripetal force required to move in a circle versus a road in which the centripetal acceleration builds up gradually on a Cornu spiral before being constant on the circular arc. The second animation shows the increasing curvature of the transition curve which is able to connect to a circular arc of progressively smaller radius.

In the horizontal plane, the radius of a transition curve varies continually over its length between the disparate radii of the sections that it joins—for example, from infinite radius at a tangent to the nominal radius of a smooth curve. The resulting spiral provides a gradual, eased transition, preventing undesirable sudden, abrupt changes in lateral (centripetal) acceleration that would otherwise occur without a transition curve. Similarly, on highways, transition curves allow drivers to change steering gradually when entering or exiting curves.

Transition curves also serve as a transition in the vertical plane, whereby the elevation of the inside or outside of the curve is lowered or raised to reach the nominal amount of bank for the curve.

== History ==
On early railroads, because of the low speeds and wide-radius curves employed, the surveyors were able to ignore any form of easement, but during the 19th century, as speeds increased, the need for a track curve with gradually increasing curvature became apparent. Rankine's 1862 Civil Engineering cites several such curves, including an 1828 or 1829 proposal based on the "curve of sines" by William Gravatt, and the curve of adjustment by William Froude around 1842 approximating the elastic curve. The actual equation given in Rankine is that of a cubic curve, which is a polynomial curve of degree 3, at the time also known as a cubic parabola.

In the UK, only from 1845, when legislation and land costs began to constrain the laying out of rail routes and tighter curves were necessary, were the principles beginning to be applied in practice.

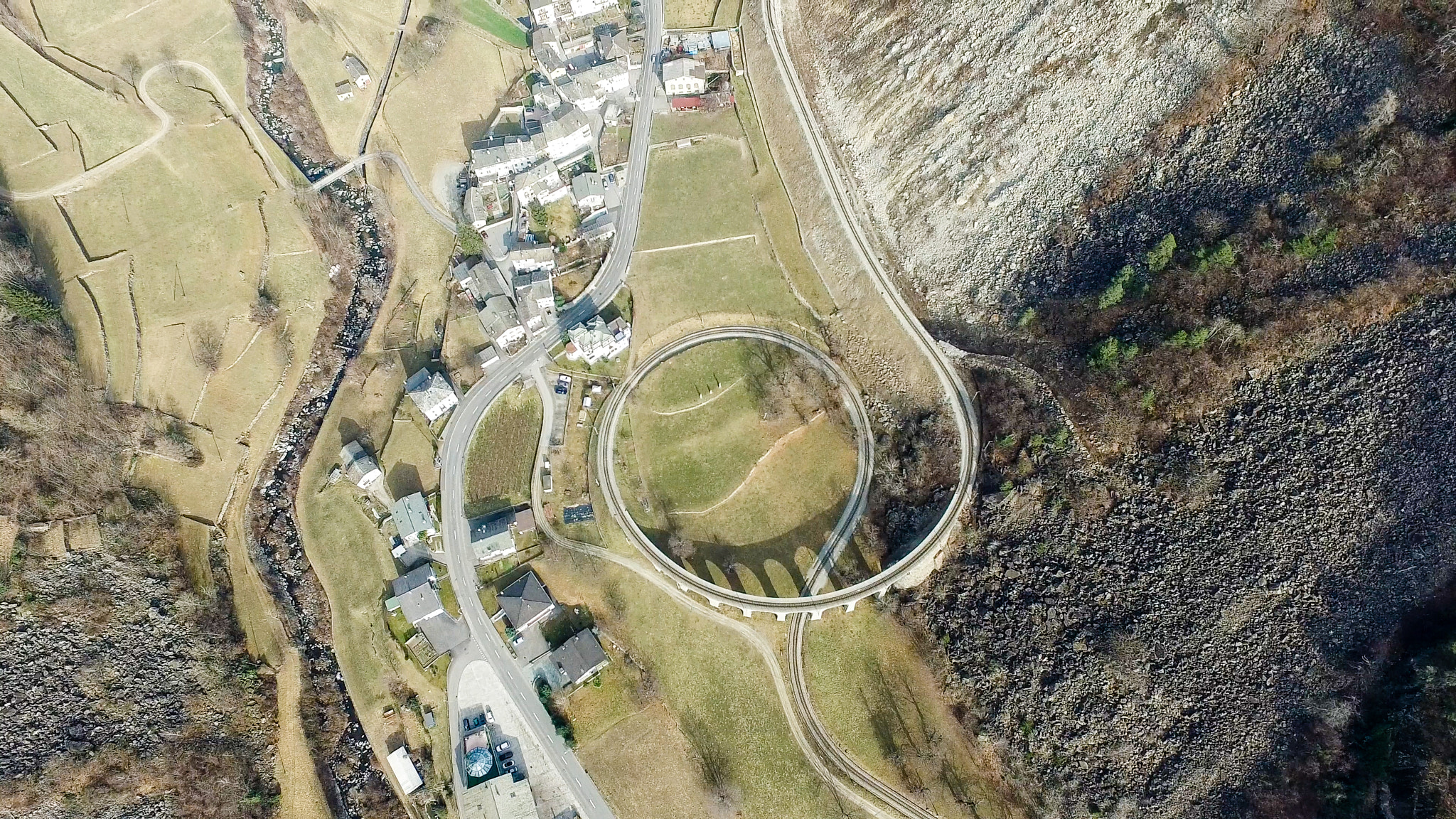
Brusio spiral viaduct and railway (Switzerland, built 1908), from above

The 'true spiral', whose curvature is exactly linear in arclength, requires more sophisticated mathematics (in particular, the ability to integrate its intrinsic equation) to compute than the proposals that were cited by Rankine. Several late-19th century civil engineers seem to have derived the equation for this curve independently (all unaware of the original characterization of the curve by Leonhard Euler in 1744). Charles Crandall gives credit to one Ellis Holbrook, in the Railroad Gazette on December 3, 1880, for the first accurate description of the curve. Another early publication was The Railway Transition Spiral by Arthur N. Talbot, originally published in 1890. Some early 20th century authors call the curve "Glover's spiral" and attribute it to James Glover's 1900 publication.

The equivalence of the railroad transition spiral and the clothoid seems to have been first published in 1922 by Arthur Lovat Higgins. Since then, "clothoid" is the most common name given the curve, but the correct name (following standards of academic attribution) is 'Euler spiral'.

== Geometry ==
While railroad track geometry is intrinsically three-dimensional, for practical purposes the vertical and horizontal components of track geometry are usually treated separately.

The overall design pattern for the vertical geometry is typically a sequence of constant grade segments connected by vertical transition curves in which the local grade varies linearly with distance and in which the elevation therefore varies quadratically with distance. Here grade refers to the tangent of the angle of rise of the track. The design pattern for horizontal geometry is typically a sequence of straight line (i.e., a tangent) and curve (i.e. a circular arc) segments connected by transition curves.

The degree of banking in railroad track is typically expressed as the difference in elevation of the two rails, commonly quantified and referred to as the superelevation. Such difference in the elevation of the rails is intended to compensate for the centripetal acceleration needed for an object to move along a curved path, so that the lateral acceleration experienced by passengers/the cargo load will be minimized, which enhances passenger comfort/reduces the chance of load shifting (movement of cargo during transit, causing accidents and damage).

Superelevation is not the same as the roll angle of the rail which is used to describe the "tilting" of the individual rails instead of the banking of the entire track structure as reflected by the elevation difference at the "top of rail". Regardless of the horizontal alignment and the superelevation of the track, the individual rails are almost always designed to "roll"/"cant" towards gauge side (the side where the wheel is in contact with the rail) to compensate for the horizontal forces exerted by wheels under normal rail traffic.

The change of superelevation from zero in a tangent segment to the value selected for the body of a following curve occurs over the length of a transition curve that connects the tangent and the curve proper. Over the length of the transition the curvature of the track will also vary from zero at the end abutting the tangent segment to the value of curvature of the curve body, which is numerically equal to one over the radius of the curve body.

The simplest and most commonly used form of transition curve is that in which the superelevation and horizontal curvature both vary linearly with distance along the track. Cartesian coordinates of points along this spiral are given by the Fresnel integrals. The resulting shape matches a portion of an Euler spiral, which is also commonly referred to as a "clothoid", and sometimes "Cornu spiral".

A transition curve can connect a track segment of constant non-zero curvature to another segment with constant curvature that is zero or non-zero of either sign. Successive curves in the same direction are sometimes called progressive curves and successive curves in opposite directions are called reverse curves.

The Euler spiral provides the shortest transition subject to a given limit on the rate of change of the track superelevation (i.e. the twist of the track). However, as has been recognized for a long time, it has undesirable dynamic characteristics due to the large (conceptually infinite) roll acceleration and rate of change of centripetal acceleration at each end. Because of the capabilities of personal computers it is now practical to employ spirals that have dynamics better than those of the Euler spiral.

== See also ==
- Degree of curvature
- Minimum railway curve radius
- Railway systems engineering

== Sources ==
- Simmons, Jack; Biddle, Gordon (1997). The Oxford Companion to British Railway History. Oxford University Press. ISBN 0-19-211697-5.
- Biddle, Gordon (1990). The Railway Surveyors. Chertsey, UK: Ian Allan. ISBN 0-7110-1954-1.
- Hickerson, Thomas Felix (1967). Route Location and Design. New York: McGraw Hill. ISBN 0-07-028680-9.
- Cole, George M; and Harbin; Andrew L (2006). Surveyor Reference Manual. Belmont, CA: Professional Publications Inc. p. 16. ISBN 1-59126-044-2.
- Railway Track Design pdf from The American Railway Engineering and Maintenance of Way Association, accessed 4 December 2006.
- Kellogg, Norman Benjamin (1907). The Transition Curve or Curve of Adjustment (3rd ed.). New York: McGraw.
