= Hudde's rules =

Two properties of polynomial roots

In mathematics, Hudde's rules are two properties of polynomial roots described by Johann Hudde.

1. If r is a double root of the polynomial equation
  $$a_0x^n + a_1x^{n-1} + \cdots + a_{n-1}x + a_n = 0$$
  and if $b_0, b_1, \dots, b_{n-1}, b_n$ are numbers in arithmetic progression, then r is also a root of
  $$a_0b_0x^n + a_1b_1x^{n-1} + \cdots + a_{n-1}b_{n-1}x + a_nb_n = 0.$$
  This definition is a form of the modern theorem that if r is a double root of ƒ(x) = 0, then r is a root of ƒ '(x) = 0.
2. If for x = a the polynomial
  $$a_0x^n + a_1x^{n-1} + \cdots + a_{n-1}x + a_n$$
  takes on a relative maximum or minimum value, then a is a root of the equation
  $$na_0x^n + (n-1)a_1x^{n-1} + \cdots + 2a_{n-2}x^2 + a_{n-1}x = 0.$$
  This definition is a modification of Fermat's theorem in the form that if ƒ(a) is a relative maximum or minimum value of a polynomial ƒ(x), then ƒ '(a) = 0, where ƒ ' is the derivative of ƒ.

Hudde was working with Frans van Schooten on a Latin edition of La Géométrie of René Descartes. In the 1659 edition of the translation, Hudde contributed two letters: "Epistola prima de Redvctione Ǣqvationvm" (pages 406 to 506), and "Epistola secvnda de Maximus et Minimus" (pages 507 to 16). These letters may be read by the Internet Archive link below.
