= Intrinsics =

Intrinsics or intrinsic may refer to:

- Intrinsic and extrinsic properties, in science and engineering
- Intrinsic motivation in psychology
- Intrinsic muscle, in anatomy
- Intrinsic function, a function in a programming language that is dealt with specially by a compiler
- X Toolkit Intrinsics, a library
- Intrinsic factor (biology)
- Intrinsic semiconductor (materials science)
- Intrinsic equation (geometry)
