= William Neile =

English mathematician

William Neile (7 December 1637 – 24 August 1670) was an English mathematician and founder member of the Royal Society. His major mathematical work, the rectification of the semicubical parabola, was carried out when he was aged nineteen, and was published by John Wallis. By carrying out the determination of arc lengths on a curve given algebraically, in other words by extending to algebraic curves generally with Cartesian geometry a basic concept from differential geometry, it represented a major advance in what would become infinitesimal calculus. His name also appears as Neil.

== Life ==
Neile was born at Bishopsthorpe, the eldest son of Sir Paul Neile MP for Ripon and Newark. His grandfather was Richard Neile, the Archbishop of York. He entered Wadham College, Oxford as a gentleman-commoner in 1652, matriculating in 1655. He was taught by John Wilkins and Seth Ward.

In 1657, he became a student at the Middle Temple. In the same year he gave his exact rectification of the semicubical parabola and communicated his discovery to William Brouncker, Christopher Wren and others connected with Gresham College. His demonstration was published by Wallis in De Cycloide (1659). The general formula for rectification by definite integral was in effect discovered by Hendrik van Heuraet in 1659. In 1673 Wallis asserted that Christiaan Huyghens, who was advancing his own claim to have influenced Heuraet, was also slighting the priority of Neile.

Neile was elected a fellow of the Royal Society on 7 January 1663 and a member of the council on 11 April 1666. He entered the debate on the theory of motion, as a critic of the empiricist stance of other members. His own theory of motion was held up from publication by unfavourable peer review by Wallis, in 1667; a revision was communicated to the society on 29 April 1669. Neile objected to Wren's 1668 work on collision as lacking discussion of causality: he asked for discussion of the nature of momentum. His own work was much influenced by ideas drawn from the De Corpore of Thomas Hobbes.

He made astronomical observations with instruments erected on the roof of his father's residence, the “Hill House” (later called Waltham Place) at White Waltham in Berkshire, where he died at the age of 32. A white marble monument in the parish church of White Waltham commemorates him and an inscribed slab in the floor marks his burial-place. He belonged to the privy council of King Charles II.

== Notes ==
Attribution

This article incorporates text from a publication now in the public domain: Lee, Sidney, ed. (1894). "Neile, William". Dictionary of National Biography. Vol. 40. London: Smith, Elder & Co.
