= Hendrik van Heuraet =

Dutch mathematician

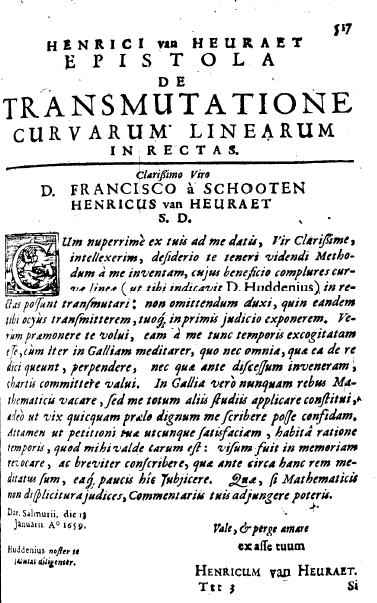
- Born: 1634; Haarlem, Dutch Republic
- Died: c. 1660; Leiden?, Dutch Republic
- Known for: Integral and Calculus
- Scientific career
- Fields: Mathematics
- Academic advisors: Frans van Schooten

Hendrik van Heuraet (1634 – c. 1660), also known as Henrici van Heuraet, was a Dutch mathematician. He is noted as one of the founders of the integral, and author of Epistola de Transmutatione Curvarum Linearum in Rectus [On the Transformation of Curves into Straight Lines] (1659).

== Life ==
He was born in 1634 and became financially independent after he inherited his father's estate – who was a cloth merchant – when he was 21 years old. From 1653 he initially studied medicine at Leiden University, where he became acquainted with Frans van Schooten and later Johannes Hudde and Christiaan Huygens. He continued studying medicine, but decided to study mathematics privately with Van Schooten. In 1658 he and Hudde left for Saumur in France. From Saumur he wrote a letter to van Schooten entitled Epistola de transmutatione curvarum linearum in rectas (On the Transformation of Curves into Straight Lines). He returned to Leiden the next year as a physician. Little else is known about his life after this.

== Work ==
Van Heuraet's work was published in Van Schooten's edited Latin translation of Descartes's La Géométrie of 1659. This work also contained appendices by Johan de Witt and Johannes Hudde. It contained two papers written by Van Heuraet. In one of the papers, Van Heureaet gives the construction of inflection points on the conchoid; the importance of the discovery of properties of curves of this type eventually led to methods which gave rise to the differential and integral calculus. In particular, in the paper, he computed an integral and applied his methods to the parabola. Furthermore, Van Heuraet proved in his papers that he could find the arc length of the semicubical parabola, which eventually led to a priority dispute with Christiaan Huygens.

== Bibliography ==
- van Maanen, Jan A. (1984). "Hendrick van Heureat (1634-1660?): His Life and Mathematical Work". Centaurus. 27 (3): 218–279. Bibcode:1984Cent...27..218V. doi:10.1111/j.1600-0498.1984.tb00781.x. ISSN 0008-8994.
