= Whewell equation =

Mathematical equation

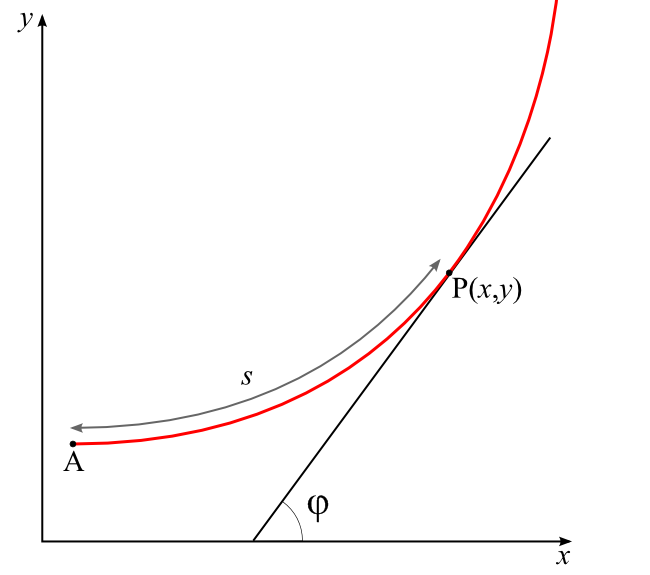
Important quantities in the Whewell equation

The Whewell equation of a plane curve relates the tangential angle (φ) with arc length (s), where the tangential angle is the angle between the tangent to the curve at some point and the x-axis, and the arc length is the distance along the curve from a fixed point. These quantities do not depend on the coordinate system used except for the choice of the direction of the x-axis, so this is an intrinsic equation of the curve, or, less precisely, the intrinsic equation. If one curve is obtained from another curve by translation then their Whewell equations will be the same.

When the relation is a function, so that tangential angle is given as a function of arc length, certain properties become easy to manipulate. In particular, the derivative of the tangential angle with respect to arc length is equal to the curvature. Thus, taking the derivative of the Whewell equation yields a Cesàro equation for the same curve.

The concept is named after William Whewell, who introduced it in 1849, in a paper in the Cambridge Philosophical Transactions. In his conception, the angle used is the deviation from the direction of the curve at some fixed starting point, and this convention is sometimes used by other authors as well. This is equivalent to the definition given here by the addition of a constant to the angle or by rotating the curve.

== Properties ==
If a point $\vec r = (x, y)$ on the curve is given parametrically in terms of the arc length, $s \mapsto \vec r,$ then the tangential angle φ is determined by

$$\frac {d \vec r}{ds}
= \begin{pmatrix} \frac{dx}{ds} \\ \frac{dy}{ds} \end{pmatrix}
= \begin{pmatrix} \cos \varphi \\ \sin \varphi \end{pmatrix}
\quad \text {since} \quad
\left | \frac {d \vec r}{ds} \right | = 1 ,$$

which implies
$$\frac{dy}{dx} = \tan \varphi.$$

Parametric equations for the curve can be obtained by integrating:
$$\begin{align}
x &= \int \cos \varphi \, ds, \\
y &= \int \sin \varphi \, ds.
\end{align}$$

Since the curvature is defined by
$$\kappa = \frac{d\varphi}{ds},$$

the Cesàro equation is easily obtained by differentiating the Whewell equation.

== Examples ==
Curve	Equation
Line	$\varphi = c$
Circle	$s = a\varphi$
Logarithmic Spiral	$s = \frac{a e^{\varphi\tan\alpha}}{\sin\alpha}$
Catenary	$s = a\tan \varphi$
Tautochrone	$s = a\sin \varphi$
