= Claude Rabuel =

French Jesuit mathematician

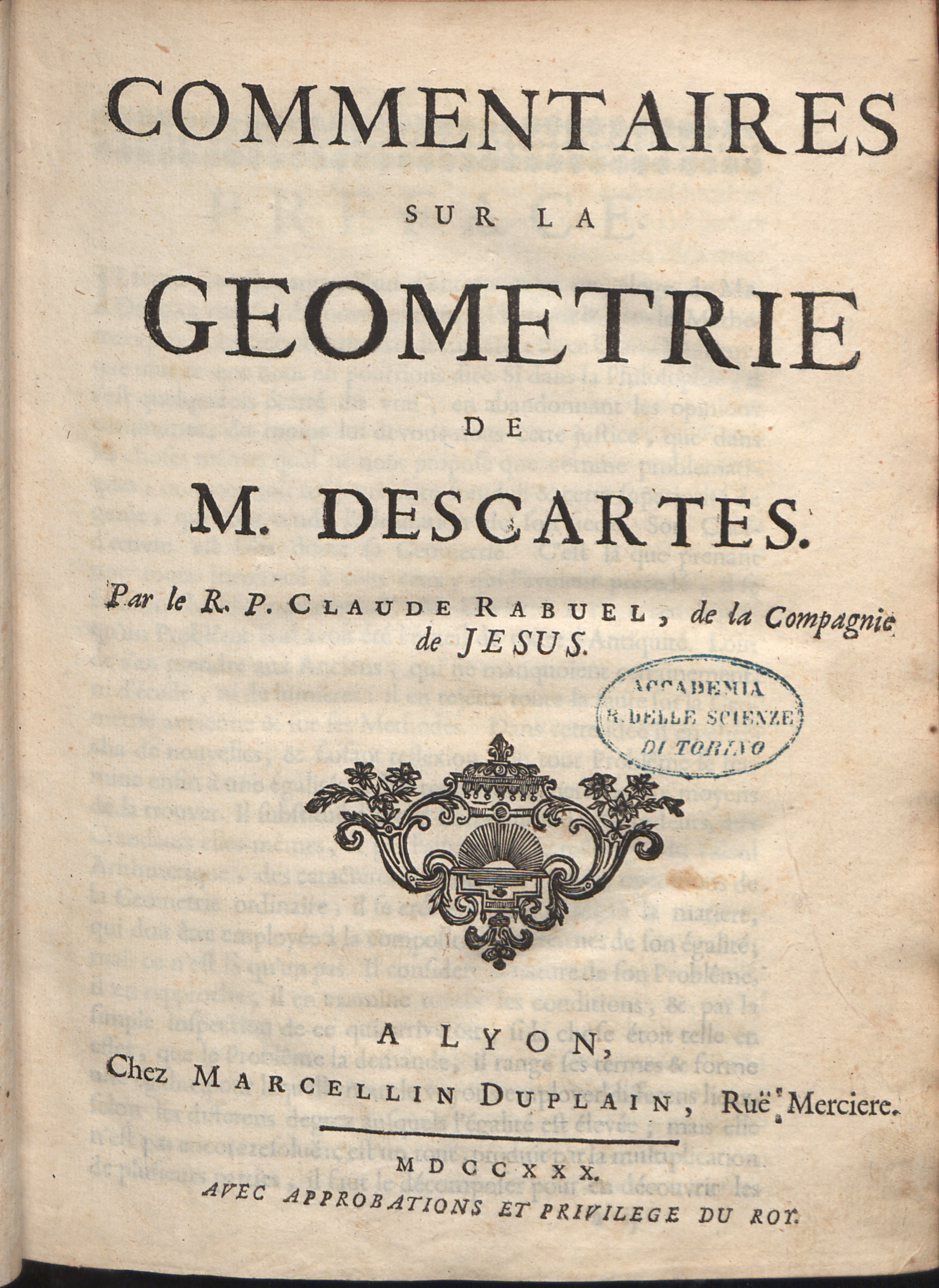
Commentaires sur la Géométrie de M. Descartes, title page (1730)

Claude Rabuel (1669–1729) was a French Jesuit mathematician. He analyzed Descartes's Géométrie.

Rabuel was professor at the Collège de la Trinité in Lyon.

== Works ==
- Commentaires sur la Géométrie de M. Descartes. Lyon: Marcellin Duplain. 1730. From Biblioteca europea di informazione e cultura
  - Commentaires sur la Géométrie de M. Descartes. 1730. From Internet Archive
