= Fresnel integral =

Special function defined by an integral

Plots of S(x) and C(x). The maximum of C(x) is about 0.977451424. If the integrands of S and C were defined using π/2t^{2} instead of t^{2}, then the image would be scaled vertically and horizontally (see below).

The Fresnel integrals S(x) and C(x), and their auxiliary functions F(x) and G(x) are transcendental functions named after Augustin-Jean Fresnel that are used in optics and are closely related to the error function (erf). They arise in the description of near-field Fresnel diffraction phenomena and are defined through the following integral representations:

$$\begin{align}
S(x) &= \int_0^x \sin\left(t^2\right)\,dt, \\
C(x) &= \int_0^x \cos\left(t^2\right)\,dt, \\
F(x) &= \left(\frac{1}{2}\sqrt{\frac{\pi}{2}}-S\left(x\right)\right)\cos\left(x^2\right)-\left(\frac{1}{2}\sqrt{\frac{\pi}{2}}-C\left(x\right)\right)\sin\left(x^2\right), \\
G(x) &= \left(\frac{1}{2}\sqrt{\frac{\pi}{2}}-S\left(x\right)\right)\sin\left(x^2\right)+\left(\frac{1}{2}\sqrt{\frac{\pi}{2}}-C\left(x\right)\right)\cos\left(x^2\right).
\end{align}$$

The parametric curve $\bigl(S(t), C(t)\bigr)$ is the Euler spiral or clothoid, a curve whose curvature varies linearly with arclength.

The term Fresnel integral may also refer to the complex definite integral

$$\int_{-\infty}^\infty e^{\pm iax^2} dx = \sqrt{\frac{\pi}{a}}e^{\pm i\pi/4}$$

where a is real and positive; this can be evaluated by closing a contour in the complex plane and applying Cauchy's integral theorem.

== Definition ==
Fresnel integrals with arguments π/2t^{2} instead of t^{2} converge to 1/2 instead of 1/2·√π/2.

The Fresnel integrals admit the following Maclaurin series that converge for all x:
$$\begin{align}
S(x) &= \int_0^x \sin\left(t^2\right)\,dt = \sum_{n=0}^{\infin}(-1)^n \frac{x^{4n+3}}{(2n+1)!(4n+3)}, \\
C(x) &= \int_0^x \cos\left(t^2\right)\,dt = \sum_{n=0}^{\infin}(-1)^n \frac{x^{4n+1}}{(2n)!(4n+1)}.
\end{align}$$

Some widely used tables use π/2t^{2} instead of t^{2} for the argument of the integrals defining S(x) and C(x). This changes their limits at infinity from 1/2·√π/2 to 1/2 and the arc length for the first spiral turn from √2π to 2 (at t = 2). These alternative functions are usually known as normalized Fresnel integrals.

The Auxiliary functions F(x) and G(x) provide monotonic bounds for the Fresnel Integrals:
$$\begin{align}
\frac{1}{2}\sqrt{\frac{\pi}{2}}-F(x)-G(x) \leq C(x) \leq \frac{1}{2}\sqrt{\frac{\pi}{2}}+F(x)+G(x), \\
\frac{1}{2}\sqrt{\frac{\pi}{2}}-F(x)-G(x) \leq S(x) \leq \frac{1}{2}\sqrt{\frac{\pi}{2}}+F(x)+G(x).
\end{align}$$

== Euler spiral ==
Euler spiral (x, y) = (C(t), S(t)). The spiral converges to the centre of the holes in the image as t tends to positive or negative infinity.

Animation depicting evolution of a Cornu spiral with the tangential circle with the same radius of curvature as at its tip, also known as an osculating circle.

The Euler spiral, also known as a Cornu spiral or clothoid, is the curve generated by a parametric plot of S(t) against C(t). The Euler spiral was first studied in the mid 18th century by Leonhard Euler in the context of Euler–Bernoulli beam theory. A century later, Marie Alfred Cornu constructed the same spiral as a nomogram for diffraction computations.

From the definitions of Fresnel integrals, the infinitesimals dx and dy are thus:
$$\begin{align}
dx &= C'(t)\,dt = \cos\left(t^2\right)\,dt, \\
dy &= S'(t)\,dt = \sin\left(t^2\right)\,dt.
\end{align}$$

Thus the length of the spiral measured from the origin can be expressed as
$$L = \int_0^{t_0} \sqrt {dx^2 + dy^2} = \int_0^{t_0} dt = t_0.$$

That is, the parameter t is the curve length measured from the origin (0, 0), and the Euler spiral has infinite length. The vector (cos(t^{2}), sin(t^{2})), where θ = t^{2}, also expresses the unit tangent vector along the spiral. Since t is the curve length, the curvature κ can be expressed as
$$\kappa = \frac{1}{R} = \frac{d\theta}{dt} = 2t.$$

Thus the rate of change of curvature with respect to the curve length is
$$\frac{d\kappa}{dt} = \frac {d^2\theta}{dt^2} = 2.$$

An Euler spiral has the property that its curvature at any point is proportional to the distance along the spiral, measured from the origin. This property makes it useful as a transition curve in highway and railway engineering: if a vehicle follows the spiral at unit speed, the parameter t in the above derivatives also represents the time. Consequently, a vehicle following the spiral at constant speed will have a constant rate of angular acceleration.

Sections from Euler spirals are commonly incorporated into the shape of rollercoaster loops to make what are known as clothoid loops.

== Properties ==
C(x) and S(x) are odd functions of x,

$$C(-x) = -C(x), \quad S(-x) = -S(x).$$

which can be readily seen from the fact that their power series expansions have only odd-degree terms, or alternatively because they are antiderivatives of even functions that also are zero at the origin.

Asymptotics of the Fresnel integrals as x → ∞ are given by the formulas:

$$\begin{align}
S(x) & =\sqrt{\tfrac18\pi} \sgn x - \left[ 1 + O\left(x^{-4}\right) \right] \left( \frac{\cos\left(x^2\right)}{2x} + \frac{\sin\left(x^2\right)}{ 4x^3 } \right), \\[6px]
C(x) & =\sqrt{\tfrac18\pi} \sgn x + \left[ 1 + O\left(x^{-4}\right) \right] \left( \frac{\sin\left(x^2\right)}{2x} - \frac{\cos\left(x^2\right)}{ 4x^3 } \right) .
\end{align}$$

Complex Fresnel integral S(z)

Using the power series expansions above, the Fresnel integrals can be extended to the domain of complex numbers, where they become entire functions of the complex variable z.

The Fresnel integrals can be expressed using the error function as follows:

Complex Fresnel integral C(z)

$$\begin{align}
S(z) & =\sqrt{\frac{\pi}{2}} \cdot\frac{1+i}{4} \left[ \operatorname{erf}\left(\frac{1+i}{\sqrt{2}}z\right) -i \operatorname{erf}\left(\frac{1-i}{\sqrt{2}}z\right) \right], \\[6px]
C(z) & =\sqrt{\frac{\pi}{2}} \cdot\frac{1-i}{4} \left[ \operatorname{erf}\left(\frac{1+i}{\sqrt{2}}z\right) + i \operatorname{erf}\left(\frac{1-i}{\sqrt{2}}z\right) \right].
\end{align}$$

or

$$\begin{align}
C(z) + i S(z) & = \sqrt{\frac{\pi}{2}}\cdot\frac{1+i}{2} \operatorname{erf}\left(\frac{1-i}{\sqrt{2}}z\right), \\[6px]
S(z) + i C(z) & = \sqrt{\frac{\pi}{2}}\cdot\frac{1+i}{2} \operatorname{erf}\left(\frac{1+i}{\sqrt{2}}z\right).
\end{align}$$

=== Limits as x approaches infinity ===
The integrals defining C(x) and S(x) cannot be evaluated in the closed form in terms of elementary functions, except in special cases. The limits of these functions as x goes to infinity are known:
$$\int_0^\infty \cos \left(t^2\right)\,dt = \int_0^\infty \sin \left(t^2\right) \, dt = \frac{\sqrt{2\pi}}{4} = \sqrt{\frac{\pi}{8}} \approx 0.6267.$$

Proof of the formula

The sector contour used to calculate the limits of the Fresnel integrals

This can be derived with any one of several methods. One of them uses a contour integral of the function
$$e^{-z^2}$$
around the boundary of the sector-shaped region in the complex plane formed by the positive x-axis, the bisector of the first quadrant y = x with x ≥ 0, and a circular arc of radius R centered at the origin.

As R goes to infinity, the integral along the circular arc γ_{2} tends to 0
$$\left|\int_{\gamma_2}e^{-z^2}\,dz\right|
= \left|\int_0^\frac{\pi}{4}e^{-R^2(\cos t + i \sin t)^2}\,Re^{it}dt\right|
\leq R\int_0^\frac{\pi}{4}e^{-R^2\cos2t}\,dt
\leq R\int_0^\frac{\pi}{4}e^{-R^2\left(1-\frac{4}{\pi}t\right)}\,dt
= \frac{\pi}{4R}\left(1-e^{-R^2}\right),$$
where polar coordinates z = Re^{it} were used and Jordan's inequality was utilised for the second inequality. The integral along the real axis γ_{1} tends to the half Gaussian integral
$$\int_{\gamma_1} e^{-z^2} \, dz = \int_0^\infty e^{-t^2} \, dt = \frac{\sqrt{\pi}}{2}.$$

Note too that because the integrand is an entire function on the complex plane, its integral along the whole contour is zero by the Cauchy integral theorem. Overall, we must have
$$\int_{\gamma_3} e^{-z^2} \, dz = \int_{\gamma_1} e^{-z^2} \, dz = \int_0^\infty e^{-t^2} \, dt,$$
where γ_{3} denotes the bisector of the first quadrant, as in the diagram. To evaluate the left hand side, parametrize the bisector as
$$z = te^{i\frac{\pi}{4}} = \frac{\sqrt{2}}{2}(1 + i)t$$
where t ranges from 0 to +∞. Note that the square of this expression is just +it^{2}. Therefore, substitution gives the left hand side as
$$\int_0^\infty e^{-it^2}\frac{\sqrt{2}}{2}(1 + i) \, dt.$$

Using Euler's formula to take real and imaginary parts of e^{−it^{2}} gives this as
$$\begin{align}
& \int_0^\infty \left(\cos\left(t^2\right) - i\sin\left(t^2\right)\right)\frac{\sqrt{2}}{2}(1 + i) \, dt \\[6px]
&\quad = \frac{\sqrt{2}}{2} \int_0^\infty \left[\cos\left(t^2\right) + \sin\left(t^2\right) + i \left(\cos\left(t^2\right) - \sin\left(t^2\right)\right) \right] \, dt \\[6px]
&\quad = \frac{\sqrt{\pi}}{2} + 0i,
\end{align}$$
where we have written 0i to emphasize that the original Gaussian integral's value is completely real with zero imaginary part. Letting
$$I_C = \int_0^\infty \cos\left(t^2\right) \, dt, \quad I_S = \int_0^\infty \sin\left(t^2\right) \, dt$$
and then equating real and imaginary parts produces the following system of two equations in the two unknowns I_{C} and I_{S}:
$$\begin{align}
I_C + I_S & = \sqrt{\frac{\pi}{2}}, \\
I_C - I_S & = 0.
\end{align}$$

Solving this for I_{C} and I_{S} gives the desired result.

== Generalization ==
The integral
$$\int x^m e^{ix^n}\,dx = \int\sum_{k=0}^\infty\frac{i^kx^{m+nk}}{k!}\,dx
= \sum_{k=0}^\infty \frac{i^k}{(m+nk+1)}\frac{x^{m+nk+1}}{k!}$$
is a confluent hypergeometric function and also an incomplete gamma function
$$\begin{align}
\int x^m e^{ix^n}\,dx & =\frac{x^{m+1}}{m+1}\,_1F_1\left(\begin{array}{c} \frac{m+1}{n}\\1+\frac{m+1}{n}\end{array}\mid ix^n\right) \\[6px]
& =\frac{1}{n} i^\frac{m+1}{n}\gamma\left(\frac{m+1}{n},-ix^n\right),
\end{align}$$
which reduces to Fresnel integrals if real or imaginary parts are taken:
$$\int x^m\sin(x^n)\,dx = \frac{x^{m+n+1}}{m+n+1}
\,_1F_2\left(\begin{array}{c}\frac{1}{2}+\frac{m+1}{2n}\\
\frac{3}{2}+\frac{m+1}{2n},\frac{3}{2}\end{array}\mid -\frac{x^{2n}}{4}\right).$$
The leading term in the asymptotic expansion is
$$_1F_1 \left(\begin{array}{c}\frac{m+1}{n}\\1+\frac{m+1}{n} \end{array}\mid ix^n\right)\sim \frac{m+1}{n}\,\Gamma\left(\frac{m+1}{n}\right) e^{i\pi\frac{m+1}{2n}} x^{-m-1},$$
and therefore
$$\int_0^\infty x^m e^{ix^n}\,dx = \frac{1}{n} \,\Gamma\left(\frac{m+1}{n}\right)e^{i\pi\frac{m+1}{2n}}.$$

For m = 0, the imaginary part of this equation in particular is
$$\int_0^\infty\sin\left(x^a\right)\,dx = \Gamma\left(1+\frac{1}{a} \right) \sin\left(\frac{\pi}{2a}\right),$$
with the left-hand side converging for |a| > 1 and the right-hand side being its analytical extension to the whole plane less where lie the poles of Γ(a^{−1}).

The Kummer transformation of the confluent hypergeometric function is
$$\int x^m e^{ix^n}\,dx = V_{n,m}(x)e^{ix^n},$$
with
$$V_{n,m} := \frac{x^{m+1}}{m+1}\,_1F_1\left(\begin{array}{c} 1 \\ 1 + \frac{m+1}{n} \end{array}\mid -ix^n\right).$$

== Numerical approximation ==
For computation to arbitrary precision, the power series is suitable for small argument. For large argument, asymptotic expansions converge faster. Continued fraction methods may also be used.

For computation to particular target precision, other approximations have been developed. William J. Cody developed a set of efficient approximations based on rational functions that give relative errors down to 2×10^{−19}. A FORTRAN implementation of the Cody approximation that includes the values of the coefficients needed for implementation in other languages was published by van Snyder. Boersma developed an approximation with error less than 1.6×10^{−9}.

== Applications ==
The Fresnel integrals were originally used in the calculation of the electromagnetic field intensity in an environment where light bends around opaque objects. More recently, they have been used in the design of highways and railways, specifically their curvature transition zones, see track transition curve. Other applications are rollercoasters or calculating the transitions on a velodrome track to allow rapid entry to the bends and gradual exit.

== Gallery ==
Plot of the Fresnel integral function S(z) in the complex plane from -2-2i to 2+2i with colors created with Mathematica 13.1 function ComplexPlot3D

Plot of the Fresnel integral function C(z) in the complex plane from -2-2i to 2+2i with colors created with Mathematica 13.1 function ComplexPlot3D

Plot of the Fresnel auxiliary function G(z) in the complex plane from -2-2i to 2+2i with colors created with Mathematica 13.1 function ComplexPlot3D

Plot of the Fresnel auxiliary function F(z) in the complex plane from -2-2i to 2+2i with colors created with Mathematica 13.1 function ComplexPlot3D

== See also ==
- Böhmer integral
- Fresnel zone
- Track transition curve
- Euler spiral
- Zone plate
- Dirichlet integral
