= Johannes Hudde =

Dutch mathematician and mayor

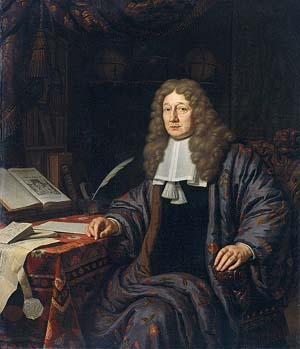
- Portrait by Michiel van Musscher
- Born: 23 April 1628; Amsterdam
- Died: 15 April 1704 (aged 75); Amsterdam
- Education: Leiden University
- Scientific career
- Fields: Mathematics
- Academic advisors: Frans van Schooten

Johannes (van Waveren) Hudde (23 April 1628 – 15 April 1704) was a mathematician, burgomaster (mayor) of Amsterdam between 1672 – 1703, and governor of the Dutch East India Company.

Hudde initially studied law at the University of Leiden, until he turned to mathematics under the influence of Frans van Schooten. He contributed to the theory of equations in his posthumous De reductione aequationum of 1713, in which he was the first to take literal coefficients in algebra as indifferently positive or negative. In the Latin translation that Van Schooten made of Descartes' La Géométrie, Hudde, together with Johan de Witt and Hendrik van Heuraet, published work of their own. Hudde's contribution consisted of describing an algorithm for simplifying the calculations necessary to determine a double root to a polynomial equation. And establishing two properties of polynomial roots known as Hudde's rules, that point toward algorithms of calculus.

As a "burgemeester" of Amsterdam he ordered that the city canals should be flushed at high tide and that the polluted water of the town "secreten" should be diverted to pits outside the town instead of into the canals. He also promoted hygiene in and around the town's water supply. "Hudde's stones" were marker stones that were used to mark the summer high water level at several points in the city. They later were the foundation for the "NAP", the now Europe-wide system for measuring water levels.

== Mathematical work ==
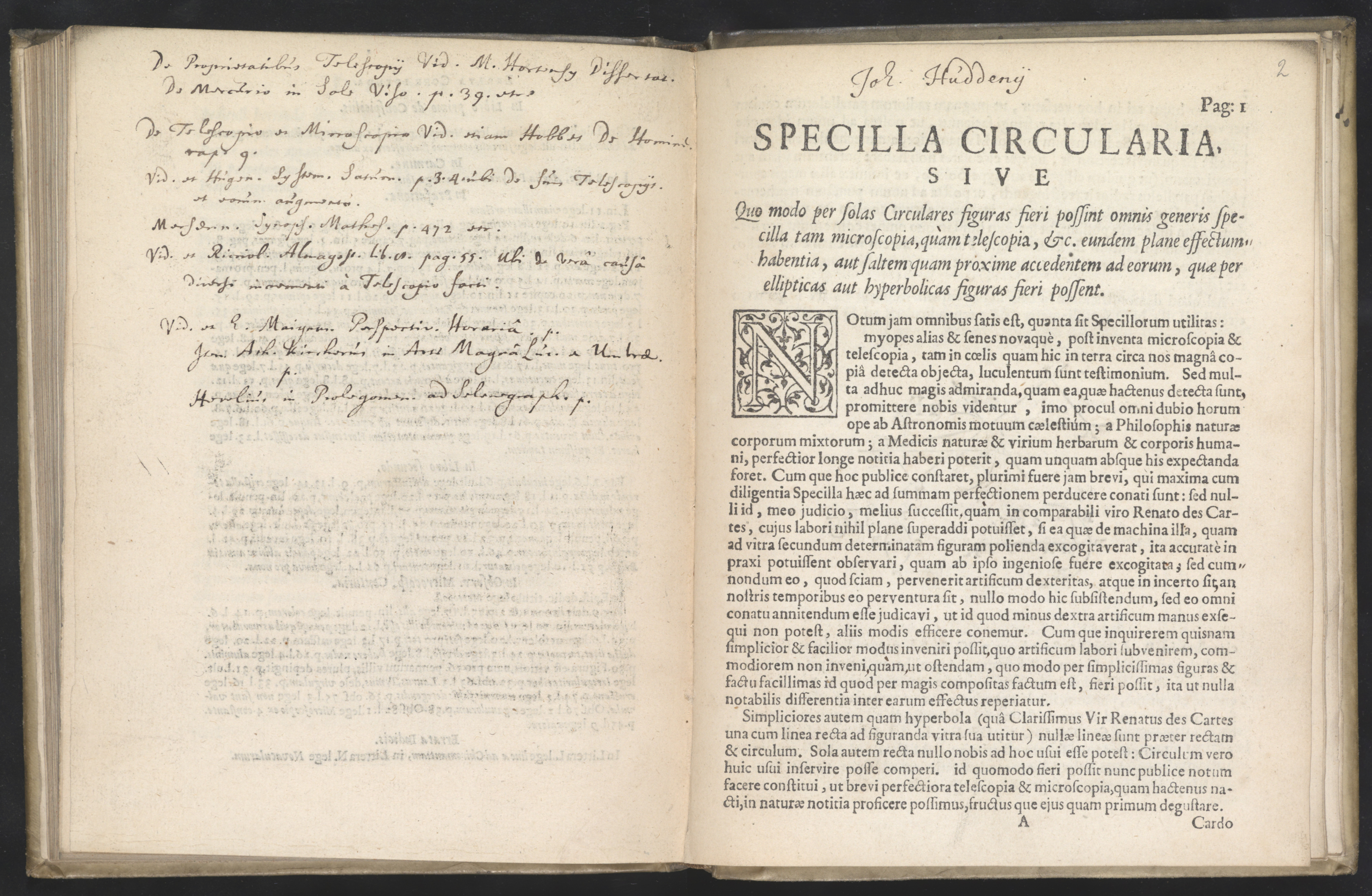
Specilla circularia, a text on telescopes from 1656 by Johannes Hudde

Hudde studied law at the University of Leiden, but turned to mathematics under the influence of his teacher Frans van Schooten. From 1654 to 1663 he worked under van Schooten.

La Géométrie (1637) by René Descartes provided an introduction to analytic geometry in French, whereas Latin was still the international language of science. Schooten and his students including Hudde, Johan de Witt and Hendrik van Heuraet published a Latin translation of La Geometrie in 1659. Each of the students added to the work. Hudde's contribution described Hudde's rules and made a study of maxima and minima. He added to the translation of La Geometrie two papers of his own: Epistola Prima de Reductione Aequationum on algebraic equations, and Epistola Secunda de Maximis et Minimis, in which he described an algorithm for simplifying the calculations necessary to determine a double root to a polynomial equation. Together with René-François de Sluse, Hudde provided general algorithms by which one could routinely construct tangents to curves given by polynomial equations.

Hudde corresponded with Baruch Spinoza and Christiaan Huygens, Johann Bernoulli, Isaac Newton and Leibniz. Newton and Leibniz mention Hudde, and especially Hudde's rule, many times and used some of his ideas in their own work on infinitesimal calculus.

== See also ==
- History of group theory
- Mercator series
- Tangent
