= Böhmer integral =

In mathematics, Böhmer integrals are integrals introduced by Paul Böhmer generalizing Fresnel integrals.

The integrals are defined for all $x\geq 0$ and $\alpha < 1$ as

$$\operatorname{S}(x,\alpha) = \int_x^\infty t^{\alpha-1} \sin(t) \, dt, \quad \operatorname{C}(x,\alpha) = \int_x^\infty t^{\alpha-1} \cos(t) \, dt.$$

When $\alpha=1/2$, Böhmer integrals reduce to Fresnel integrals $S(x), C(x)$ by

$$\begin{align}
\operatorname{S}(x) &= \frac1{2}-\frac1{\sqrt{2\pi}}\cdot\operatorname{S}\left(\frac1{2},x^2\right), \\[1ex]
\operatorname{C}(x) &= \frac1{2}-\frac1{\sqrt{2\pi}}\cdot\operatorname{C}\left(\frac1{2},x^2\right).
\end{align}$$

The sine integral and cosine integral can also be expressed in terms of the Böhmer integrals by

$$\operatorname{Si}(x) = \frac{\pi}{2} -\operatorname{S}(x,0), \quad \operatorname{Ci}(x) = - \operatorname{C}(x,0).$$
