= Van Schooten's theorem =

Property of equilateral triangles

$|PA| = |PB| + |PC|$

Van Schooten's theorem, named after the Dutch mathematician Frans van Schooten, describes a property of equilateral triangles. It states:

For an equilateral triangle $\triangle ABC$ with a point $P$ on its circumcircle the length of longest of the three line segments $PA$, $PB$, $PC$ connecting $P$ with the vertices of the triangle equals the sum of the lengths of the other two.

The theorem is a consequence of Ptolemy's theorem for cyclic quadrilaterals. Let $a$ be the side length of the equilateral triangle $\triangle ABC$ and $PA$ the longest line segment. The triangle's vertices together with $P$ form a cyclic quadrilateral $\square ABPC$. By Ptolemy's theorem,

$$|BC| \cdot |PA| = |AC| \cdot |PB| + |AB| \cdot |PC|.$$

But, since the triangle is equilateral, $|BC| = |AC| = |AB| = a$, so

$$\begin{align}
a \cdot |PA| &= a \cdot |PB| + a \cdot |PC| \\[3mu]
|PA| &= |PB| + |PC|.
\end{align}$$
