= Cesàro equation =

Equation in geometry

In geometry, the Cesàro equation of a plane curve is an equation relating the curvature (κ) at a point of the curve to the arc length (s) from the start of the curve to the given point. It may also be given as an equation relating the radius of curvature (R) to arc length. (These are equivalent because R = 1/κ.) Two congruent curves will have the same Cesàro equation. Cesàro equations are named after Ernesto Cesàro.

== Log-aesthetic curves ==
The family of log-aesthetic curves is determined in the general ($\alpha \ne 0$) case by the following intrinsic equation:

$R(s)^\alpha = c_0s + c_1$

This is equivalent to the following explicit formula for curvature:

$\kappa(s) = (c_0s+c_1)^{-1/\alpha}$

Further, the $c_1$ constant above represents simple re-parametrization of the arc length parameter, while $c_0$ is equivalent to uniform scaling, so log-aesthetic curves are fully characterized by the $\alpha$ parameter.

In the special case of $\alpha=0$, the log-aesthetic curve becomes Nielsen's spiral, with the following Cesàro equation (where $a$ is a uniform scaling parameter):

$\kappa(s) = \frac{e^{\frac{s}{a}}}{a}$

A number of well known curves are instances of the log-aesthetic curve family. These include circle ($\alpha = \infty$), Euler spiral ($\alpha = -1$), Logarithmic spiral ($\alpha = 1$), and Circle involute ($\alpha = 2$).

== Examples ==
Some curves have a particularly simple representation by a Cesàro equation. Some examples are:

- Line: $\kappa = 0$.
- Circle: $\kappa = \frac{1}{\alpha}$, where ${\alpha}$ is the radius.
- Logarithmic spiral: $\kappa=\frac{a}{s}$, where ${a}$ is a constant.
- Circle involute: $\kappa=\frac{a}{\sqrt s}$, where ${a}$ is a constant.
- Euler spiral: $\kappa=as$, where ${a}$ is a constant.
- Catenary: $\kappa=\frac{a}{s^2+a^2}$, where ${a}$ is a constant.

== Related parameterizations ==
The Cesàro equation of a curve is related to its Whewell equation in the following way: if the Whewell equation is φ = f (s) then the Cesàro equation is κ = f′(s).
