= Frans van Schooten =

Dutch mathematician (1615–1660)

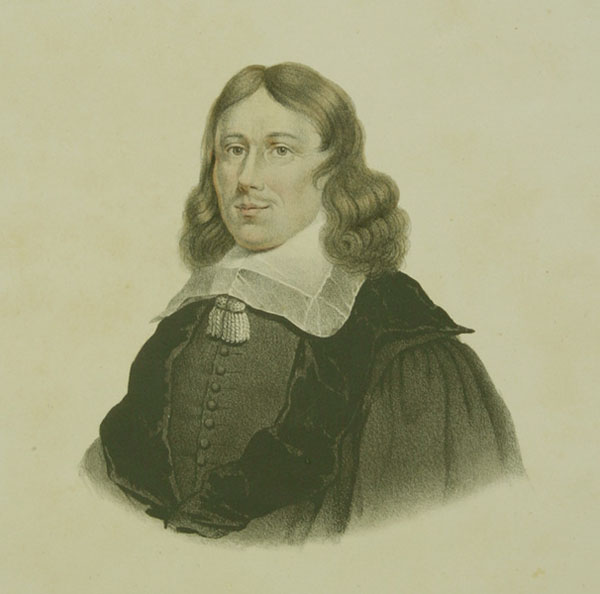
- Born: 1615; Leiden, Dutch Republic
- Died: 29 May 1660 (aged 44–45); Leiden, Dutch Republic
- Known for: Van Schooten's theorem
- Scientific career
- Fields: Mathematics
- Notable students: Christiaan Huygens

Frans van Schooten Jr., also rendered as Franciscus van Schooten (1615 – 29 May 1660), was a Dutch mathematician who is most known for popularizing the analytic geometry of René Descartes. He translated La Géométrie in Latin and wrote commentaries and explanations to it. Because most contemporary scientists and mathematicians in Europe knew the invention of analytic geometry through Van Schooten's edition, with its extensive commentaries by Johannes Hudde, Johan de Witt, and Hendrik van Heuraet, he had a significant influence on the science and mathematics of Europe at the time; especially on the invention of calculus by Gottfried Leibniz and Isaac Newton.

== Life ==
Van Schooten's father, Frans van Schooten Senior was a professor of mathematics at the University of Leiden, having Christiaan Huygens, Johann van Waveren Hudde, and René de Sluze as students.

Van Schooten met Descartes in 1632 and read his Géométrie (an appendix to his Discours de la méthode) while it was still unpublished. Finding it hard to understand, he went to France to study the works of other important mathematicians of his time, such as François Viète and Pierre de Fermat. Frans van Schooten returned home to Leiden in 1643 to assist his father and, two years later, inherited his father's position as professor at Leiden's Engineering School. One of his most important pupils at this time was Huygens.

The pendant marriage portraits of him and his wife Margrieta Wijnants were painted by Rembrandt and are kept in the National Gallery of Art:

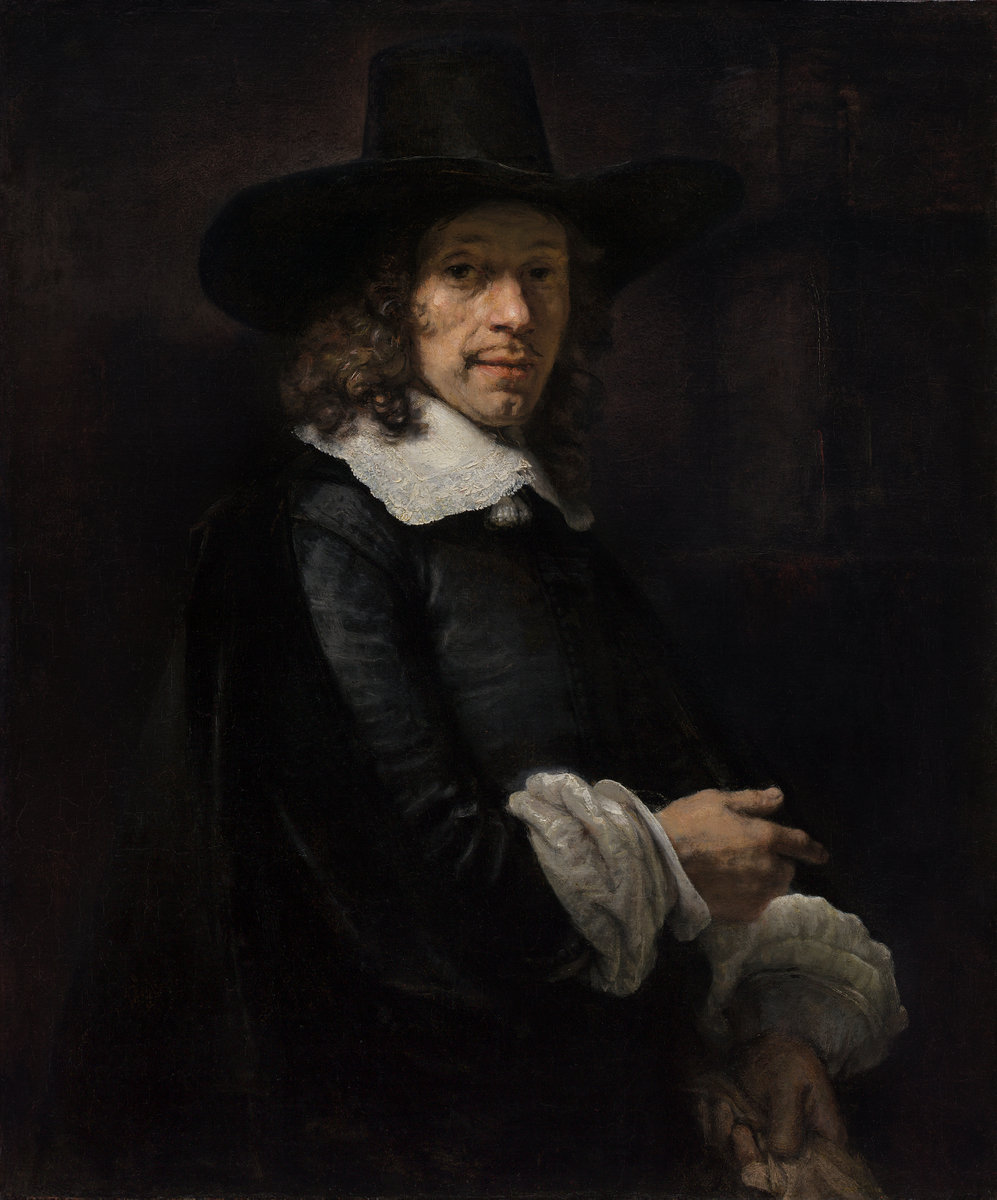
Portrait of a Gentleman with a Tall Hat and Gloves

Portrait of a Lady with an Ostrich-Feather Fan

== Work ==
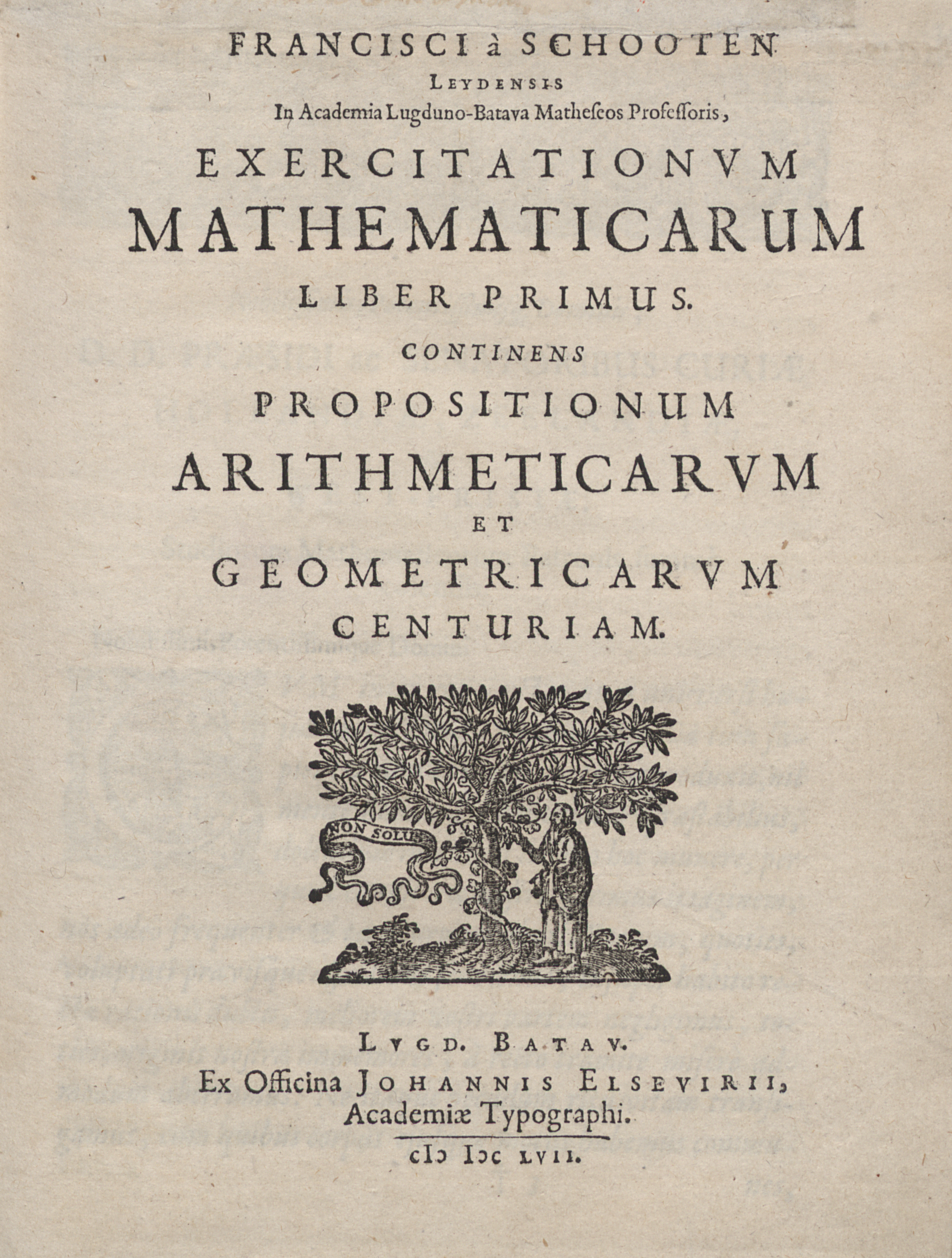
Exercitationum mathematicarum libri, 1656-1657

Van Schooten's 1649 Latin translation of and commentary on Descartes' Géométrie was valuable in that it made the work comprehensible to the broader mathematical community, and thus was responsible for the spread of analytic geometry to the world.

Over the next decade he enlisted the aid of other mathematicians of the time, de Beaune, Hudde, Heuraet, de Witt and expanded the commentaries to two volumes, published in 1659 and 1661. This edition and its extensive commentaries was far more influential than the 1649 edition. It was this edition that Gottfried Leibniz and Isaac Newton knew.

Van Schooten was one of the first to suggest, in exercises published in 1657, that these ideas be extended to three-dimensional space. Van Schooten's efforts also made Leiden the centre of the mathematical community for a short period in the middle of the seventeenth century.

In elementary geometry Van Schooten's theorem is named after him.

== Sources ==
- Some Contemporaries of Descartes, Fermat, Pascal and Huygens: Van Schooten, based on W. W. Rouse Ball's A Short Account of the History of Mathematics (4th edition, 1908)
