= Florimond de Beaune =

French jurist and mathematician

Florimond de Beaunne
- Born: 7 October 1601; Blois, County of Blois, Kingdom of France
- Died: 18 August 1652 (aged 50); Blois, Kingdom of France
- Known for: Proto-calculus
- Scientific career
- Fields: Mathematics

Florimond de Beaune (7 October 1601, Blois – 18 August 1652, Blois) was a French jurist and mathematician, and an early follower of René Descartes. R. Taton calls him "a typical example of the erudite amateurs" active in 17th-century science.

In a 1638 letter to Descartes, de Beaune posed a problem that can be reformulated in modern notation as solving the differential equation
$$\frac{dy}{dx}=\frac{\alpha}{y-x}$$
now seen as the first example of the inverse tangent method of deducing properties of a curve from its tangents.

His Tractatus de limitibus aequationum was reprinted in England in 1807; in it, he finds upper and lower bounds for the solutions to quadratic equations and cubic equations, as simple functions of the coefficients of these equations. His Doctrine de l'angle solide and Inventaire de sa bibliothèque were also reprinted, in Paris in 1975. Another of his writings was Notae breves, the introduction to a 1649 edition of Descartes's La Géométrie.
