= Arthur Newell Talbot =

American civil engineer (1857-1942)

- Born: October 1, 1857; Cortland, Illinois, US
- Died: April 3, 1942 (aged 84); Chicago, Illinois, US
- Occupations: Civil engineer; professor
- Employer: University of Illinois Urbana-Champaign
- Spouse: Virginia Mann Hammet (m. 1886; died 1919)
- Children: 4

Arthur Newell Talbot (October 21, 1857 – April 3, 1942) was an American civil engineer. He made many contributions to several engineering fields including structures, sewage management, and education. He is considered to be a pioneer in the field of reinforced concrete.

== Biography ==
=== Early life and education ===
Talbot was born on October 21, 1857, at Cortland, Illinois. His elementary education was in Cortland, and he attended high school in nearby Sycamore. After graduating from high school, he taught in a country school for two years.

He enrolled at Illinois Industrial University (now the University of Illinois Urbana-Champaign) in 1877 to study civil engineering. He was a brilliant student and also participated in many extracurricular activities. He was secretary, vice president and president of the Philomathean Literary Society, associate editor of the Illini delegate to the Interstate Oratorical Association, class essayist, a leading officer in the student government, and an officer in the Cadet Corps. He graduated from the university in 1881.

=== Career ===
After graduation, Talbot headed west and did railroad construction and maintenance in Colorado, Idaho, Kansas, and New Mexico. In September 1885, he returned to the University of Illinois as an assistant professor of engineering and mathematics. He taught a wide range of subjects, which at different times included mathematics, surveying, engineering drawing, contracts and specifications, roads and pavements, railroad engineering, mechanics and materials, hydraulics, tunneling and explosives, and water supply and sewerage.

In 1890, he was named Professor of Municipal and Sanitary Engineering in charge of Theoretical and Applied Mechanics. Around this time, engineering schools began expanding rapidly, and engineering materials and mechanics began to attract his attention even more than sanitary engineering. Without ever changing his title, the emphasis of his work continued to be placed on mechanics and materials.

In 1926, he retired and was named Professor of Municipal and Sanitary Engineering, Emeritus.

=== Personal life ===
Talbot married Virginia Mann Hammet in Camargo, Illinois, on June 7, 1886. They had 4 children together. She died on December 4, 1919.

== Awards & recognitions ==
Honorary Doctorates

- Doctor of Science, University of Pennsylvania, 1915
- Doctor of Engineering, University of Michigan, 1916
- Doctor of Laws, University of Illinois, 1931

Medals

- George Henderson Medal from the Franklin Institute, 1931
- John Fritz Medal, 1937
