= List of curves topics =

This is an alphabetical index of articles related to curves used in mathematics.

- Acnode
- Algebraic curve
- Arc
- Asymptote
- Asymptotic curve
- Barbier's theorem
- Bézier curve
- Bézout's theorem
- Birch and Swinnerton-Dyer conjecture
- Bitangent
- Bitangents of a quartic
- Cartesian coordinate system
- Caustic
- Cesàro equation
- Chord (geometry)
- Cissoid
- Circumference
- Closed timelike curve
- concavity
- Conchoid (mathematics)
- Confocal
- Contact (mathematics)
- Contour line
- Crunode
- Cubic Hermite curve
- Curvature
- Curve orientation
- Curve fitting
  - Curve-fitting compaction
- Curve of constant width
- Curve of pursuit
- Curves in differential geometry
- Cusp
- Cyclogon
- De Boor algorithm
- Differential geometry of curves
- Eccentricity (mathematics)
- Elliptic curve cryptography
- Envelope (mathematics)
- Fenchel's theorem
- Genus (mathematics)
- Geodesic
- Geometric genus
- Great-circle distance
- Harmonograph
- Hedgehog (curve)
- Hilbert's sixteenth problem
- Hyperelliptic curve cryptography
- Inflection point
- Inscribed square problem
- intercept, y-intercept, x-intercept
- Intersection number
- Intrinsic equation
- Isoperimetric inequality
- Jordan curve
  - Jordan curve theorem
- Knot
- Limit cycle
- Linking coefficient
- List of circle topics
- Loop (knot)
- M-curve
- Mannheim curve
- Meander (mathematics)
- Mordell conjecture
- Natural representation
- Opisometer
- Orbital elements
- Osculating circle
- Osculating plane
- Osgood curve
- Parallel (curve)
- Parallel transport
- Parametric curve
  - Bézier curve
  - Spline (mathematics)
    - Hermite spline
      - Beta spline
        - B-spline
    - Higher-order spline
    - NURBS
- Perimeter
- Pi
- Plane curve
- Pochhammer contour
- Polar coordinate system
- Prime geodesic
- Projective line
- Ray
- Regular parametric representation
- Reuleaux triangle
- Ribaucour curve
- Riemann–Hurwitz formula
- Riemann–Roch theorem
- Riemann surface
- Road curve
- Sato–Tate conjecture
- secant
- Singular solution
- Sinuosity
- Slope
- Space curve
- Spinode
- Square wheel
- Subtangent
- Tacnode
- Tangent
- Tangent space
- Tangential angle
- Torsion of curves
- Trajectory
- Transcendental curve
- W-curve
- Whewell equation
- World line

== See also ==
- Curve
- List of curves
- List of differential geometry topics
