= Darboux vector =

Angular velocity vector of the Frenet frame of a space curve

In differential geometry, especially the theory of space curves, the Darboux vector is the angular velocity vector of the Frenet frame of a space curve. It is named after Gaston Darboux who discovered it. It is also called angular momentum vector, because it is directly proportional to angular momentum.

In terms of the Frenet–Serret apparatus, the Darboux vector ω can be expressed as

$$\boldsymbol{\omega} = \tau \mathbf{T} + \kappa \mathbf{B} \qquad \qquad (1)$$

and it has the following symmetrical properties:

$$\boldsymbol{\omega} \times \mathbf{T} = \mathbf{T'},$$

$$\boldsymbol{\omega} \times \mathbf{N} = \mathbf{N'},$$

$$\boldsymbol{\omega} \times \mathbf{B} = \mathbf{B'},$$

which can be derived from equation (1) by means of the Frenet–Serret theorem (or vice versa).

Let a rigid object move along a regular curve described parametrically by β(t). This object has its own intrinsic coordinate system. As the object moves along the curve, let its intrinsic coordinate system keep itself aligned with the curve's Frenet frame. As it does so, the object's motion will be described by two vectors: a translation vector, and a rotation vector ω, which is an areal velocity vector: the Darboux vector.

Note that this rotation is kinematic, rather than physical, because usually when a rigid object moves freely in space its rotation is independent of its translation. The exception would be if the object's rotation is physically constrained to align itself with the object's translation, as is the case with the cart of a roller coaster.

Consider the rigid object moving smoothly along the regular curve. Once the translation is "factored out", the object is seen to rotate the same way as its Frenet frame. The total rotation of the Frenet frame is the combination of the rotations of each of the three Frenet vectors:

$$\boldsymbol{\omega} = \boldsymbol{\omega}_\mathbf{T} + \boldsymbol{\omega}_\mathbf{N} + \boldsymbol{\omega}_\mathbf{B}.$$

Each Frenet vector moves about an "origin" which is the centre of the rigid object (pick some point within the object and call it its centre). The areal velocity of the tangent vector is:

$$\boldsymbol{\omega}_\mathbf{T} = \lim_{\Delta t \rightarrow 0} {\mathbf{T}(t) \times \mathbf{T}(t + \Delta t) \over 2 \, \Delta t}$$

$$= {\mathbf{T}(t) \times \mathbf{T'}(t) \over 2}.$$

Likewise,

$$\boldsymbol{\omega}_\mathbf{N} = {1 \over 2} \ \mathbf{N}(t) \times \mathbf{N'}(t),$$

$$\boldsymbol{\omega}_\mathbf{B} = {1 \over 2} \ \mathbf{B}(t) \times \mathbf{B'}(t).$$

Now apply the Frenet–Serret theorem to find the areal velocity components:

$$\boldsymbol{\omega}_\mathbf{T} = {1\over 2} \mathbf{T} \times \mathbf{T'} = {1\over 2}\kappa \mathbf{T} \times \mathbf{N} = {1\over 2}\kappa \mathbf{B}$$

$$\boldsymbol{\omega}_\mathbf{N} = {1\over 2}\mathbf{N} \times \mathbf{N'} = {1\over 2}(-\kappa \mathbf{N} \times \mathbf{T} + \tau \mathbf{N} \times \mathbf{B}) = {1\over 2}(\kappa \mathbf{B} + \tau \mathbf{T})$$

$$\boldsymbol{\omega}_\mathbf{B} = {1\over 2}\mathbf{B} \times \mathbf{B'} = -{1\over 2}\tau \mathbf{B} \times \mathbf{N} = {1\over 2}\tau \mathbf{T}$$

so that

$$\boldsymbol{\omega} = {1\over 2}\kappa \mathbf{B} + {1\over 2}(\kappa \mathbf{B} + \tau \mathbf{T}) + {1\over 2}\tau \mathbf{T} = \kappa \mathbf{B} + \tau \mathbf{T},$$

as claimed.

The Darboux vector provides a concise way of interpreting curvature κ and torsion τ geometrically: curvature is the measure of the rotation of the Frenet frame about the binormal unit vector, whereas torsion is the measure of the rotation of the Frenet frame about the tangent unit vector.
