= Fundamental theorem of curves =

Regular 3-D curves are shape and size determined by their curvature and torsion

In differential geometry, the fundamental theorem of space curves states that every regular curve in three-dimensional space, with non-zero curvature, has its shape (and size or scale) completely determined by its curvature and torsion.

== Use ==
A curve can be described, and thereby defined, by a pair of scalar fields: curvature $\kappa$ and torsion $\tau$, both of which depend on some parameter which parametrizes the curve but which can ideally be the arc length of the curve. From just the curvature and torsion, the vector fields for the tangent, normal, and binormal vectors can be derived using the Frenet–Serret formulas. Then, integration of the tangent field (done numerically, if not analytically) yields the curve.

== Congruence ==
If a pair of curves are in different positions but have the same curvature and torsion, then they are congruent to each other.

== See also ==
- Differential geometry of curves
- Gaussian curvature
