= Jean Gaston Darboux =

French mathematician (1842–1917)

Jean-Gaston Darboux
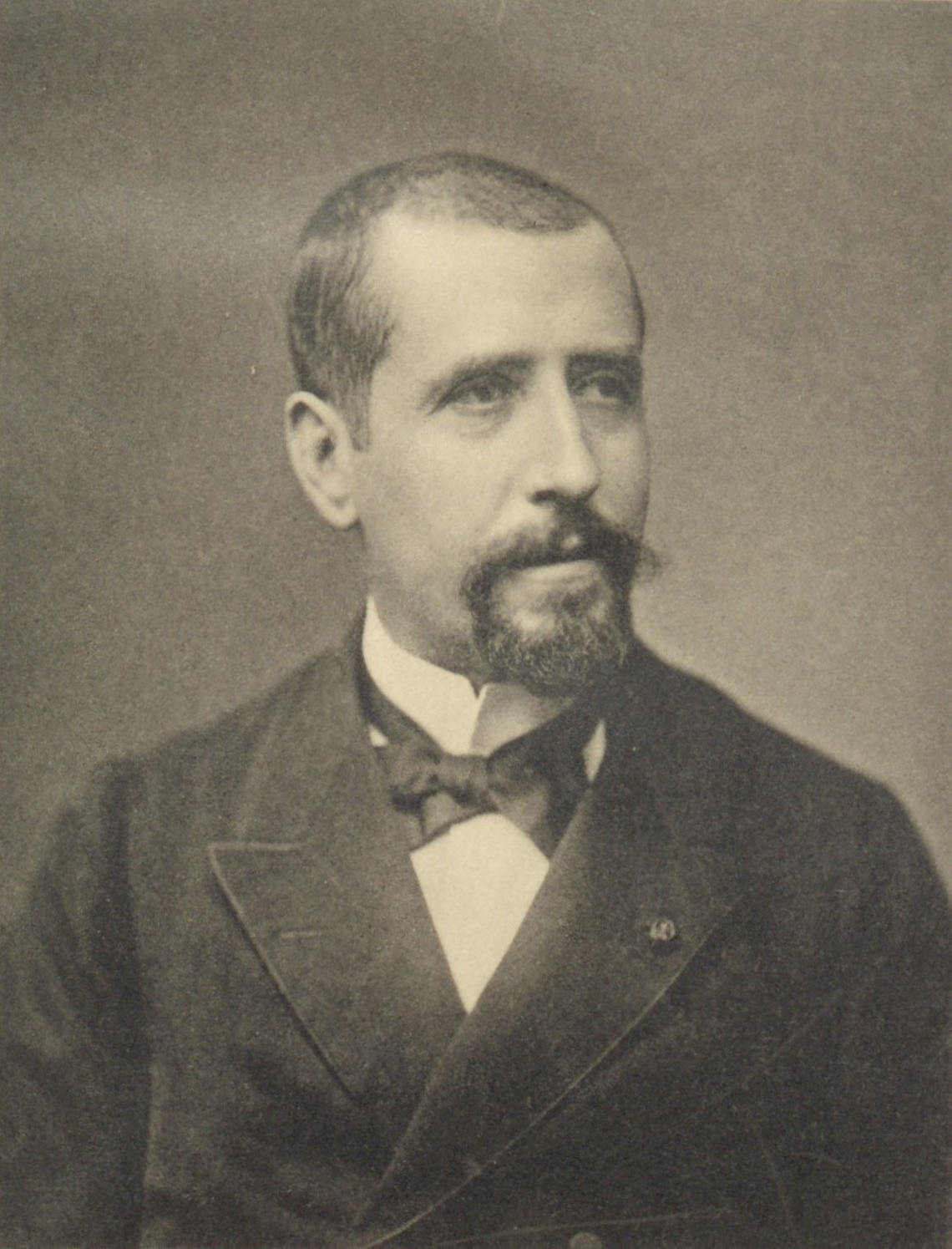
- Jean-Gaston Darboux
- Born: 14 August 1842; Nîmes, France
- Died: 23 February 1917 (aged 74); Paris, France
- Education: École Normale Supérieure
- Awards: Sylvester Medal (1916); ForMemRS (1902); Poncelet Prize (1875)
- Scientific career
- Thesis: Sur les surfaces orthogonales (1866)
- Doctoral advisor: Michel Chasles
- Doctoral students: Émile Borel; Élie Cartan; Édouard Goursat; Émile Picard; Thomas Stieltjes; Gheorghe Țițeica; Stanisław Zaremba
- Other notable students: Gaston Milhaud

Signature
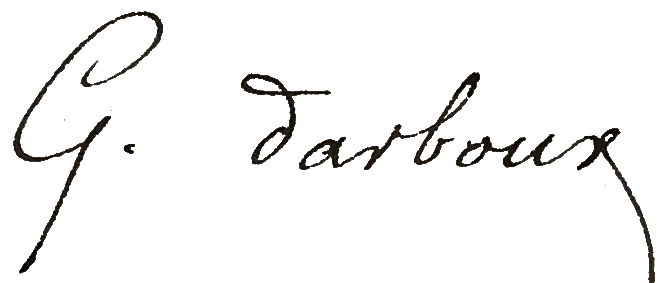

Jean-Gaston Darboux FAS MIF FRS FRSE (French: [daʁbu]; 14 August 1842 – 23 February 1917) was a French mathematician.

== Life ==
According to his birth certificate, he was born in Nîmes in France on 14 August 1842, at 1 am. However, probably due to the midnight birth, Darboux himself usually reported his own birthday as 13 August, e.g. in his filled form for Légion d'Honneur.

His parents were François Darboux, businessman of mercery, and Alix Gourdoux. His father died when Gaston was 7. His mother undertook the mercery business and insisted that her children receive good education. Gaston had a younger brother, Louis, who taught mathematics at the Lycée Nîmes for almost his entire life.

He studied at the Nîmes Lycée and the Montpellier Lycée before being accepted as the top qualifier at the École Normale Supérieure in 1861, and received his PhD there in 1866. His thesis, written under the direction of Michel Chasles, was titled Sur les surfaces orthogonales. During his studies at the ENS, he also took lectures in Sorbonne University and Collège de France.

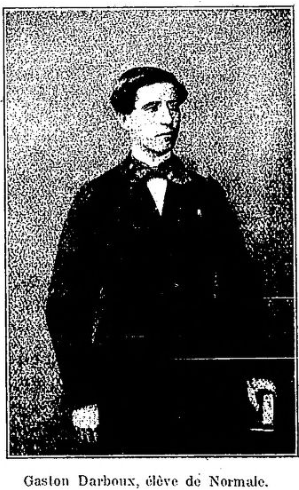
Darboux as a student of the École Normale Supérieure, c. 1865

In 1870, he co-founded the journal Bulletin des sciences mathématiques et astronomiques, called "Darboux's Journal" by his contemporary mathematicians. The publishing house was the Henry Gauthier-Villars et Cie Éditeurs, located in Paris.

In 1872, Darboux married the Beauvaisian milliner Amélie 'Célina' Carbonnier (1848–1911), daughter of Charles Louis Carbonnier, tailor, and Marie Victorine Anastase Hènocq. He and Célina had two children, Jean-Gaston (1870–1921), who was born at the time of the Siege of Paris and later became a marine zoologist at the Faculty of Science in Marseille, and Anaïs Berthe Lucie (1873–1970).

He participated in the foundation of the École normale supérieure de jeunes filles in 1880, an institute that aimed at training female educators and ran parallel to the École Normale Supérieure. Its first director was Julie Favre.

In 1884, Darboux was elected to the Académie des Sciences.

Darboux made several important contributions to geometry and mathematical analysis (see, for example, linear PDEs). He was a biographer of Henri Poincaré and he edited the Selected Works of Joseph Fourier.

Among his students were Émile Borel, Élie Cartan, Édouard Goursat, Émile Picard, Gheorghe Țițeica and Stanisław Zaremba.

In 1892 he was awarded honorary membership of the Manchester Literary and Philosophical Society, and in 1900, he was appointed the academy's permanent secretary of its Mathematics section.

In 1902, he was elected to the Royal Society and the American Philosophical Society; in 1916, he received the Sylvester Medal from the Society. In 1908, he was a plenary speaker at the International Congress of Mathematicians in Rome. He continued to contribute to the French Bulletin des sciences mathématiques, even after 1916.

== Named in his honour ==
There are many things named after him:

- Darboux basis
- Darboux chart
- Darboux cyclide
- Darboux cubic
- Darboux derivative
- Darboux equation
- Darboux frame
- Darboux integral
- Darboux net invariants
- Darboux or Goursat problem
- Darboux transformation
- Darboux vector
- Darboux's problem
- Darboux's theorem in symplectic geometry
- Darboux's theorem in real analysis, related to the intermediate value theorem
- Darboux's formula
- Christoffel–Darboux identity
- Christoffel–Darboux formula
- Euler–Darboux equation
- Darboux–Froda's theorem
- Euler–Poisson–Darboux equation
- Laplace–Darboux transformations

== See also ==
- Envelope theorem
