= Tangential angle =

Angle between tangent line and x-axis

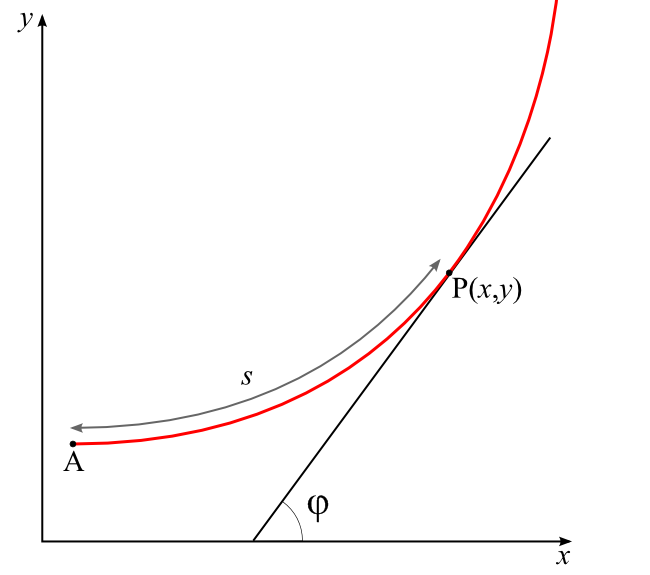
The tangential angle φ for an arbitrary curve A in P.

In geometry, the tangential angle of a curve in the Cartesian plane, at a specific point, is the angle between the tangent line to the curve at the given point and the x-axis. (Some authors define the angle as the deviation from the direction of the curve at some fixed starting point. This is equivalent to the definition given here by the addition of a constant to the angle or by rotating the curve.)

== Equations ==
=== Parametric ===
If a curve is given parametrically by (x(t), y(t)), then the tangential angle φ at t is defined (up to a multiple of 2π) by

$$\frac{\big(x'(t),\ y'(t)\big)}{\big|x'(t),\ y'(t)\big|} = (\cos \varphi,\ \sin \varphi).$$

Here, the prime symbol denotes the derivative with respect to t. Thus, the tangential angle specifies the direction of the velocity vector (x(t), y(t)), while the speed specifies its magnitude. The vector

$$\frac{\big(x'(t),\ y'(t)\big)}{\big|x'(t),\ y'(t)\big|}$$

is called the unit tangent vector, so an equivalent definition is that the tangential angle at t is the angle φ such that (cos φ, sin φ) is the unit tangent vector at t.

If the curve is parametrized by arc length s, so |x′(s), y′(s)| = 1, then the definition simplifies to

$$\big(x'(s),\ y'(s)\big) = (\cos \varphi,\ \sin \varphi).$$

In this case, the curvature κ is given by φ′(s), where κ is taken to be positive if the curve bends to the left and negative if the curve bends to the right. Conversely, the tangent angle at a given point equals the definite integral of curvature up to that point:

$$\varphi(s) = \int_{0}^s \kappa(s) ds + \varphi_0$$
$$\varphi(t) = \int_{0}^t \kappa(t) s'(t) dt + \varphi_0$$

=== Explicit ===
If the curve is given by the graph of a function y = f(x), then we may take (x, f(x)) as the parametrization, and we may assume φ is between −π/2 and π/2. This produces the explicit expression

$$\varphi = \arctan f'(x).$$

== Polar tangential angle ==
In polar coordinates, the polar tangential angle is defined as the angle between the tangent line to the curve at the given point and ray from the origin to the point. If ψ denotes the polar tangential angle, then ψ = φ − θ, where φ is as above and θ is, as usual, the polar angle.

If the curve is defined in polar coordinates by r = f(θ), then the polar tangential angle ψ at θ is defined (up to a multiple of 2π) by

$$\frac{\big(f'(\theta),\ f(\theta)\big)}{\big|f'(\theta),\ f(\theta)\big|} = (\cos \psi,\ \sin \psi)$$.

If the curve is parametrized by arc length s as r = r(s), θ = θ(s), so |(r′(s), rθ′(s))| = 1, then the definition becomes

$$\big(r'(s),\ r\theta'(s)\big) = (\cos \psi,\ \sin \psi)$$.

The logarithmic spiral can be defined a curve whose polar tangential angle is constant.

== See also ==
- Differential geometry of curves
- Whewell equation
- Subtangent
