= Osculating curve =

Plane curve with the greatest order of contact with another curve

A curve C containing a point P where the radius of curvature equals r, together with the tangent line and the osculating circle touching C at P

In differential geometry, an osculating curve is a plane curve from a given family that has the highest possible order of contact with another curve. That is, if F is a family of smooth curves, C is a smooth curve (not in general belonging to F), and P is a point on C, then an osculating curve from F at P is a curve from F that passes through P and has as many of its derivatives (in succession, from the first derivative) at P equal to the derivatives of C as possible.

The term derives from the Latinate root "osculate", to kiss, because the two curves contact one another in a more intimate way than simple tangency.

== Examples ==
Osculating ellipses – The spiral is not drawn: we see it as the locus of points where the ellipses are especially close to each other.

Examples of osculating curves of different orders include:

- The tangent line to a curve C at a point p, the osculating curve from the family of straight lines. The tangent line shares its first derivative (slope) with C and therefore has first-order contact with C.
- The osculating circle to C at p, the osculating curve from the family of circles. The osculating circle shares both its first and second derivatives (equivalently, its slope and curvature) with C.
- The osculating parabola to C at p, the osculating curve from the family of parabolas, has third order contact with C.
- The osculating conic to C at p, the osculating curve from the family of conic sections, has fourth order contact with C.

== Generalizations ==
The concept of osculation can be generalized to higher-dimensional spaces, and to objects that are not curves within those spaces. For instance an osculating plane to a space curve is a plane that has second-order contact with the curve. This is as high an order as is possible in the general case.

In one dimension, analytic curves are said to osculate at a point if they share the first three terms of their Taylor expansion about that point. This concept can be generalized to superosculation, in which two curves share more than the first three terms of their Taylor expansion.

== See also ==
- Osculating orbit
