= Spherical image =

In differential geometry, the spherical image of a unit-speed curve is given by taking the curve's tangent vectors as points, all of which must lie on the unit sphere. The movement of the spherical image describes the changes in the original curve's direction If $\alpha$ is a unit-speed curve, that is $\|\alpha^\prime \| = 1$, and $T$ is the unit tangent vector field along $\alpha$, then the curve $\sigma = T$ is the spherical image of $\alpha$. All points of $\sigma$ must lie on the unit sphere because $\|\sigma\| = \| T\| = 1$.
