= Riemann function =

Riemann function may refer to one of the several functions named after the mathematician Bernhard Riemann, including:

- Riemann zeta function
- Thomae's function, also called the Riemann function
- Riemann theta function,
- Riemann function, used in the Riemann method of solving the linear Goursat problem.
- Riemann's R, an approximation of the prime-counting function π(x); see Prime-counting function § Exact form.
- Almost nowhere differentiable Riemann function, which the Weierstrass function (nowhere-differentiable function) is based on.
