= Secant =

Secant is a term in mathematics derived from the Latin secare ("to cut"). It may refer to:

- a secant line, in geometry
- the secant variety, in algebraic geometry
- secant (trigonometry) (Latin: secans), the multiplicative inverse (or reciprocal) trigonometric function of the cosine
- the secant method, a root-finding algorithm in numerical analysis, based on secant lines to graphs of functions
- a secant ogive in nose cone design
