= Joseph-Alfred Serret =

French mathematician (1819–1885)

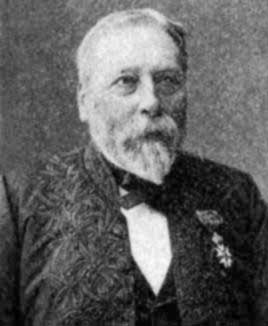
- Born: August 30, 1819; Paris, France
- Died: March 2, 1885 (aged 65); Versailles, France
- Known for: Frenet–Serret formulas
- Scientific career
- Fields: Mathematics
- Thesis: Sur le mouvement d'un point matériel attiré par deux centres fixes, en raison inverse du carré des distances. (1847)

Joseph-Alfred Serret (French: [sɛʁɛ]; August 30, 1819 – March 2, 1885) was a French mathematician who was born in Paris, France, and died in Versailles, France.

== See also ==
- Frenet–Serret formulas

== Books by J.-A. Serret ==
- Traité de trigonométrie (Gautier-Villars, 1880)
- Cours de calcul differentiel et integral t. 1 (Gauthier-Villars, 1900)
- Cours de calcul differentiel et integral t. 2 (Gauthier-Villars, 1900)
- Cours d'algèbre supérieure. Tome I (Gauthier-Villars, 1877)
- Cours d'algèbre supérieure. Tome II (Gauthier-Villars, 1879)
