= Differentiable curve =

Study of curves from a differential point of view

Differential geometry of curves is the branch of geometry that deals with smooth curves in the plane and the Euclidean space by methods of differential and integral calculus.

Many specific curves have been thoroughly investigated using the synthetic approach. Differential geometry takes another approach: curves are represented in a parametrized form, and their geometric properties and various quantities associated with them, such as the curvature and the arc length, are expressed via derivatives and integrals using vector calculus. One of the most important tools used to analyze a curve is the Frenet frame, a moving frame that provides a coordinate system at each point of the curve that is "best adapted" to the curve near that point.

The theory of curves is much simpler and narrower in scope than the theory of surfaces and its higher-dimensional generalizations because a regular curve in a Euclidean space has no intrinsic geometry. Any regular curve may be parametrized by the arc length (the natural parametrization). From the point of view of a theoretical point particle on the curve that does not know anything about the ambient space, all curves would appear the same. Different space curves are only distinguished by how they bend and twist. Quantitatively, this is measured by the differential-geometric invariants called the curvature and the torsion of a curve. The fundamental theorem of curves asserts that the knowledge of these invariants completely determines the curve.

== Definitions ==
A parametric C^{r}-curve or a C^{r}-parametrization is a vector-valued function
$$\gamma: I \to \R^{n}$$
that is r-times continuously differentiable (that is, the component functions of γ are r-times continuously differentiable), where $n \isin \N$, $r \isin \N \cup \{\infty\}$, and I is a non-empty interval of real numbers. The image of the parametric curve is $\gamma[I] \subseteq \R^n$. The parametric curve γ and its image γ[I] must be distinguished because a given subset of $\R^n$ can be the image of many distinct parametric curves. The parameter t in γ(t) can be thought of as representing time, and γ the trajectory of a moving point in space. When I is a closed interval [a, b], γ(a) is called the starting point and γ(b) is the endpoint of γ. If the starting and the end points coincide (that is, γ(a) = γ(b)), then γ is a closed curve or a loop. To be a C^{r}-loop, the function γ must be r-times continuously differentiable and satisfy γ^{(k)}(a) = γ^{(k)}(b) for 0 ≤ k ≤ r.

The parametric curve is simple if
$$\gamma|_{(a,b)}: (a,b) \to \R^{n}$$
is injective. It is analytic if each component function of γ is an analytic function, that is, it is of class C^{ω}.

The curve γ is regular of order m (where m ≤ r) if, for every t ∈ I,
$$\left\{ \gamma'(t),\gamma''(t),\ldots,{\gamma^{(m)}}(t) \right\}$$
is a linearly independent subset of $\R^n$. In particular, a parametric C^{1}-curve γ is regular if and only if γ′(t) ≠ 0 for every t ∈ I.

== Re-parametrization and equivalence relation ==
Given the image of a parametric curve, there are several different parametrizations of the parametric curve. Differential geometry aims to describe the properties of parametric curves that are invariant under certain reparametrizations. A suitable equivalence relation on the set of all parametric curves must be defined. The differential-geometric properties of a parametric curve (such as its length, its Frenet frame, and its generalized curvature) are invariant under reparametrization and therefore properties of the equivalence class itself. The equivalence classes are called C^{r}-curves and are central objects studied in the differential geometry of curves.

Two parametric $C^r$-curves, $\gamma_1 : I_1 \to \R^n$ and $\gamma_2 : I_2 \to \R^n$, are said to be equivalent if and only if there exists a bijective C^{r}-map $\varphi:I_1\to I_2$ such that
$$\forall t \in I_1: \quad \varphi'(t) \neq 0$$
and
$$\forall t \in I_1: \quad \gamma_2\bigl(\varphi(t)\bigr) = \gamma_1(t).$$
γ_{2} is then said to be a re-parametrization of γ_{1}.

Re-parametrization defines an equivalence relation on the set of all parametric C^{r}-curves of class C^{r}. The equivalence class of this relation simply a C^{r}-curve.

An even finer equivalence relation of oriented parametric C^{r}-curves can be defined by requiring φ to satisfy φ′(t) > 0.

Equivalent parametric C^{r}-curves have the same image, and equivalent oriented parametric C^{r}-curves even traverse the image in the same direction.

== Length and natural parametrization ==
The length ℓ of a parametric C^{1}-curve $\gamma : [a, b] \to \R^n$ is defined as
$$\ell ~ \stackrel{\text{def}}{=} ~ \int_a^b \left\| \gamma'(t) \right\| \, \mathrm{d}{t}.$$
The length of a parametric curve is invariant under reparametrization and is therefore a differential-geometric property of the parametric curve.

Similarly, the length of the curve from γ(a) to γ(t) can be expressed as a function of t, with s : [a, b] → [0, ℓ] defined as

$$s(t) ~ \stackrel{\text{def}}{=} ~ \int_a^t \left\| \gamma'(x) \right\| \, \mathrm{d}{x}.$$

By the first part of the Fundamental Theorem of Calculus,

$$s'(t) ~{=}~ \left\| \gamma'(t) \right\|$$

If γ is a regular C^{1}-curve, i.e. γ' is everywhere non-zero, then s(t) is strictly increasing and thus has an inverse, t(s). That inverse can be used to define, a re-parametrization of γ :

$$\bar\gamma(s) ~\stackrel{\text{def}}{=}~ \gamma(t(s))$$

Then by the chain rule and the inverse function rule, for each s and its corresponding t = t(s), the first derivative of is the unit vector that points in the same direction as the first derivative of γ :

$$\bar\gamma'(s) ~=~ \frac {\gamma'(t)} { \left\| \gamma'(t) \right\|}$$

Geometrically, this implies that for any two values of s, s_{0} < s_{1}, the distance that s travels from s_{0} to s_{1} is the same as the arc-length distance that travels from (s_{0}) to (s_{1}). Alternatively, thinking of t and s as time parameters, both γ(t) and (s) describe motion along the same path, but the motion of (s) is at a constant unit speed.

Because of this, is called an arc-length parametrization, natural parametrization, unit-speed parametrization. The parameter s(t) is called the natural parameter of γ.

For a given parametric curve γ, the natural parametrization is unique up to a shift of parameter.

If γ is also a C^{2} function, then so are s and. Using the chain rule and the inverse function rule, their second derivatives can also be expressed in terms of derivatives of γ.

$$s''(t) ~{=}~ \frac {\gamma'(t) \cdot \gamma''(t)\;} { \left\| \gamma'(t) \right\|}$$
$$\bar\gamma''(s) ~=~
\frac {\gamma''(t)}
{ \left\| \gamma'(t) \right\|^2} - \left(
\frac {\gamma''(t)}
{ \left\| \gamma'(t) \right\|^2}
\cdot
\frac {\gamma'(t)} { \left\| \gamma'(t) \right\|}
\right )
\frac {\gamma'(t)} { \left\| \gamma'(t) \right\|}$$

Thus, ′′(s) is the perpendicular component of γ′′(t) / ‖γ′(t)‖^{2} relative to the tangent vector γ′(t), and so ′′(s) is perpendicular to ′(s).

Often it is difficult or impossible to express the arc-length parametrization,, in closed form even when γ is given in closed form. This is typically the case when it is difficult or impossible to express s(t) or its inverse t(s) in closed form. However the first and second derivatives of an arc-length parametrization can be expressed only in terms of the first and second derivatives of a general parametrization. This often allows some differential-geometric properties, for example curvature, that are defined in terms of an arc-length parametrization to still be expressed in closed form when there is a general parametrization that can be expressed in closed form.

The quantity
$$E(\gamma) ~ \stackrel{\text{def}}{=} ~ \frac{1}{2} \int_a^b \left\| \gamma'(t) \right\|^2 ~ \mathrm{d}{t}$$
is sometimes called the energy or action of the curve; this name is justified because the geodesic equations are the Euler–Lagrange equations of motion for this action.

=== Logarithmic spiral example ===
A part of a logarithmic spiral with standard parametrization and selected derivative vectors.

A part of a logarithmic spiral with arc-length parametrization and selected derivative vectors.

A logarithmic spiral can be parametrized as
$$\boldsymbol\gamma(t) = a e^{kt}(\cos{t}, \sin{t}) .$$
The first graph to the right shows a logarithmic spiral for values of t from 0 to 13, a little more than 4π, and with parameters of a = 1 and k = (ln 2)/2π. With each 2π span of t, the spiral makes a complete turn and moves twice as far from the origin.

The spiral is shown in alternating segments of blue and red with each segment corresponding to a unit span of t. So it takes 2π, or a little more than 6 segments for the spiral to make one complete turn. Segments are longer as t increases.

The graph also shows the first and second derivative vectors of γ at π increments of t :

$$\boldsymbol\gamma'(t) = a e^{kt}\left(k(\cos{t}, \sin{t}) + (-\sin{t}, \cos{t}) \right)$$
$$\boldsymbol\gamma''(t) = a e^{kt}\left((k^2-1)(\cos{t}, \sin{t}) + 2k(-\sin{t}, \cos{t}) \right) .$$

The first derivative vectors, in orange, are tangent to the spiral and make about an 83.7047 degree angle with the radial vector, γ(t), which is a complementary angle to the pitch angle of about 6.2953 degrees.

The second derivative vectors, in green, are also at an angle of about 83.7047 degrees with the first derivative vectors. With each turn of the spiral, both the first and second derivative vectors double in length.

The second graph shows the same spiral with its arc-length parametrization, (s). The arc length of the first full turn is about 9.1197. For the second full turn the arc length is about 18.2394, exactly twice as long.

Some differences with the first graph include:

- The first derivative tangent vectors are all unit vectors, ‖′(s)‖ = 1.
- The red and blue segments of the spiral, which depict unit spans of s, are all the same length and have an arc length of 1.
- The second derivative vectors are perpendicular to their tangent vectors.
- The second derivative vectors, which are the curvature vectors, become shorter with increasing values of s, each full turn of the spiral cuts the length in half.

To find the arc-length parametrization from the standard parametrization, γ(t), the magnitude of the first derivative is
$$\left\|\boldsymbol\gamma'(t)\right\| = \left | a \right |e^{kt} \sqrt{k^2 + 1},$$
the arc-length function, from reference point γ(t_{0}), and its derivatives are
$$\begin{align}
s(t) &
= \frac {\left | a \right |\sqrt{k^2 + 1}} {k} (e^{kt} - e^{kt_0}) \\
s'(t) & = \left | a \right |  e^{kt} \sqrt{k^2 + 1}
= \left \| \boldsymbol\gamma'(t)\right\| \\
s''(t) & = \left | a \right |  e^{kt} k \sqrt{k^2 + 1}
= k \left \| \boldsymbol\gamma'(t)\right\| .\\
\end{align}$$
The inverse of s(t) and its derivatives are
$$\begin{align}
t(s) & = \frac 1 k \ln {\left (\frac{sk}{|a|\sqrt{k^2+1}} + e^{kt_0}\right )} \\
t'(s) & = \frac 1 {sk + e^{kt_0}|a|\sqrt{k^2+1}}
= \frac 1 {e^{kt(s)}|a|\sqrt{k^2+1}}
= \frac 1 {\left \| \boldsymbol\gamma'(t(s))\right\|}\\
t''(s) & = \frac {-k} {\left \| \boldsymbol\gamma'(t(s))\right\|^2}.\\
\end{align}$$

Then the arc-length parametrization of the spiral is
$$\begin{align}\boldsymbol{\bar\gamma}(s) & =
\boldsymbol{\gamma}(t(s)) = a e^{kt(s)}(\cos{(t(s))}, \sin{(t(s))})\\
&  = \mathrm{sign{(a)}} {\left (\frac{sk}{\sqrt{k^2+1}} + e^{kt_0}\right )}\\
& \quad \quad \left (\cos{\left (\frac 1 k \ln {\left (\frac{sk}{|a|\sqrt{k^2+1}} + e^{kt_0}\right )}\right )}, \right .\\
& \quad \quad \quad \left . \sin{\left (\frac 1 k \ln {\left (\frac{sk}{|a|\sqrt{k^2+1}} + e^{kt_0}\right )}\right )}\right ),\\ \end{align}$$
with first and second derivatives with respect to s of
$$\begin{align}
\boldsymbol{\bar\gamma}'(s) & =
\boldsymbol{\gamma}'(t(s)) ~ t'(s) = \frac {\boldsymbol\gamma'(t(s))} {\left \| \boldsymbol\gamma'(t(s))\right\|}\\
\boldsymbol{\bar\gamma}''(s) & =
\boldsymbol{\gamma}''(t(s)) ~ t'(s)^2 + \boldsymbol{\gamma}'(t(s)) ~ t''(s)   \\
& = \frac {a \left(-(\cos{t(s)}, \sin{t(s)}) + k(-\sin{t(s)}, \cos{t(s)}) \right)} {\left | a \right |^2  e^{kt(s)} (k^2 + 1)} ~. \\
\end{align}$$

The second derivative is the curvature vector for the spiral and its magnitude, the curvature κ, is
$$\begin{align}
\kappa(s) & = \left \| \boldsymbol{\bar\gamma}''(s) \right \| \\
& = \frac 1 {\left | a \right | e^{kt(s)} \sqrt{k^2 + 1}} ~.\\
\end{align}$$

== Frenet frame ==
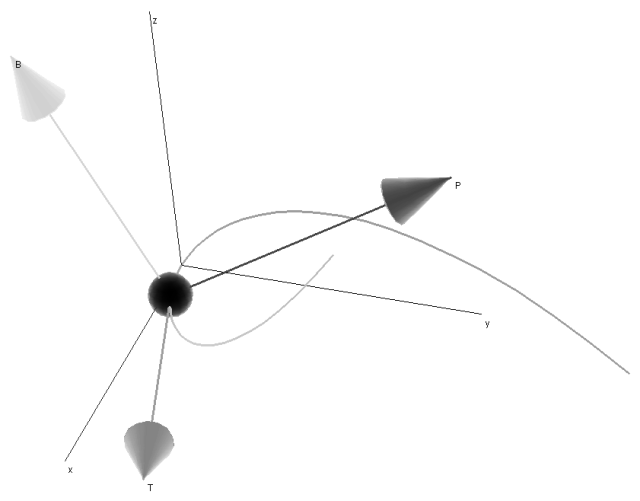
An illustration of the Frenet frame for a point on a space curve. T is the unit tangent, P the unit normal, and B the unit binormal.

A Frenet frame is a moving reference frame of n orthonormal vectors e_{i}(t) that is used to describe a curve locally at each point γ(t). It is the main tool in the differential geometric treatment of curves because it is far easier and more natural to describe local properties (e.g. curvature, torsion) in terms of a local reference system than using a global one such as Euclidean coordinates.

Given a C^{n+1}-curve γ in $\R^n$ that is regular of order n the Frenet frame for the curve is the set of orthonormal vectors
$$\mathbf{e}_1(t), \ldots, \mathbf{e}_n(t)$$
called Frenet vectors. They are constructed from the derivatives of γ(t) using the Gram–Schmidt orthogonalization algorithm with
$$\begin{align}
\mathbf{e}_1(t) &= \frac{\boldsymbol{\gamma}'(t)}{\left\| \boldsymbol{\gamma}'(t) \right\|} \\[1ex]
\mathbf{e}_{j}(t) &= \frac{\mathbf{\overline{e}}_{j}(t)}{\left\|\overline{\mathbf{e}_{j}}(t) \right\|}, &
\mathbf{\overline{e}}_{j}(t) &= \boldsymbol{\gamma}^{(j)}(t) - \sum _{i=1}^{j-1} \left\langle \boldsymbol{\gamma}^{(j)}(t), \, \mathbf{e}_i(t) \right\rangle \, \mathbf{e}_i(t)
\vphantom{\Bigg\langle}
\end{align}$$

The real-valued functions χ_{i}(t) are called generalized curvatures and are defined as
$$\chi_i(t) = \frac{\bigl\langle \mathbf{e}_i'(t), \mathbf{e}_{i+1}(t) \bigr\rangle}{\left\| \boldsymbol{\gamma}^'(t) \right\|}$$

The Frenet frame and the generalized curvatures are invariant under reparametrization and are therefore differential geometric properties of the curve. For curves in $\R^3$, χ_{1}(t) is the curvature and χ_{2}(t) is the torsion.

== Special Frenet vectors and generalized curvatures ==
The first three Frenet vectors and generalized curvatures can be visualized in three-dimensional space. They have additional names and more semantic information attached to them.

=== Tangent vector ===
If a curve γ represents the path of a particle over time, then the instantaneous velocity of the particle at a given position P is expressed by a vector, called the tangent vector to the curve at P. Given a parameterized C^{1} curve γ = γ(t), for every value t = t_{0} of the time parameter, the vector
$$\boldsymbol{\gamma}'(t_0) = \left.\frac{\mathrm{d}}{\mathrm{d}t}\boldsymbol{\gamma}(t)\right|_{t=t_0}$$
is the tangent vector at the point P = γ(t_{0}). Generally speaking, the tangent vector may be zero. The tangent vector's magnitude
$$\left\|\boldsymbol{\gamma}'(t_0)\right\|$$
is the speed at the time t_{0}.

The first Frenet vector e_{1}(t) is the unit tangent vector in the same direction, called simply the tangent direction, defined at each regular point of γ:
$$\mathbf{e}_{1}(t) = \frac{ \boldsymbol{\gamma}'(t) }{ \left\| \boldsymbol{\gamma}'(t) \right\|}.$$
If the time parameter is replaced by the arc length, t = s, then the tangent vector has unit length and the formula simplifies:
$$\mathbf{e}_{1}(s) = \boldsymbol{\gamma}'(s).$$
However, then it is no longer applicable the interpretation in terms of the particle's velocity (with dimension of length per time). The tangent direction determines the orientation of the curve, or the forward direction, corresponding to the increasing values of the parameter. The tangent direction taken as a curve traces the spherical image of the original curve.

=== Normal vector ===
The vector _{2}(t) is perpendicular to the unit tangent vector, e_{1}(t), and points in the same direction as the curvature vector, although it can have a different magnitude. It is defined as the vector rejection of the particle's acceleration from the tangent direction:
$$\mathbf{\overline{e}}_2(t) = \boldsymbol{\gamma}''(t) - \bigl\langle \boldsymbol{\gamma}''(t), \mathbf{e}_1(t) \bigr\rangle \, \mathbf{e}_1(t),$$
where the acceleration is defined as the second derivative of position with respect to time:
$$\boldsymbol{\gamma}''(t_0) = \left.\frac{\mathrm{d}^2}{\mathrm{d}t^2}\boldsymbol{\gamma}(t)\right|_{t=t_0}$$

In this context, the normal vector refers to the second Frenet vector e_{2}(t), which is a unit normal vector and is defined as
$$\mathbf{e}_2(t) = \frac{\overline{\mathbf{e}}_2(t)} {\left\| \overline{\mathbf{e}}_2(t) \right\|}.$$

The tangent and the normal vector at point t define the osculating plane at point t.

It can be shown that _{2}(t) ∝ e′_{1}(t). Therefore,
$$\mathbf{e}_2(t) = \frac{\mathbf{e}_1'(t)}{\left\| \mathbf{e}_1'(t) \right\|}.$$

=== Curvature ===
The first generalized curvature χ_{1}(t) is called curvature and measures the deviance of γ from being a straight line relative to the osculating plane. It is defined as
$$\kappa(t) = \chi_1(t) = \frac{\bigl\langle \mathbf{e}_1'(t), \mathbf{e}_2(t) \bigr\rangle}{\left\| \boldsymbol{\gamma}'(t) \right\|}$$
and is called the curvature of γ at point t. It can be shown that
$$\kappa(t) = \frac{\left\| \mathbf{e}_1'(t) \right\|}{\left\| \boldsymbol{\gamma}'(t) \right\|}.$$

The reciprocal of the curvature
$$\frac{1}{\kappa(t)}$$
is called the radius of curvature.

A circle with radius r has a constant curvature of
$$\kappa(t) = \frac{1}{r}$$
whereas a line has a curvature of 0.

=== Binormal vector ===
The unit binormal vector is the third Frenet vector e_{3}(t). It is always orthogonal to the unit tangent and normal vectors at t. It is defined as

$$\mathbf{e}_3(t) = \frac{\overline{\mathbf{e}}_3(t)} {\left\| \overline{\mathbf{e}}_3(t) \right\|}
,  \quad
\overline{\mathbf{e}}_3(t) = \boldsymbol{\gamma}'''(t) - \bigr\langle \boldsymbol{\gamma}'''(t), \mathbf{e}_1(t) \bigr\rangle \, \mathbf{e}_1(t)
- \bigl\langle \boldsymbol{\gamma}'''(t), \mathbf{e}_2(t) \bigr\rangle \,\mathbf{e}_2(t)$$

In 3-dimensional space, the equation simplifies to
$$\mathbf{e}_3(t) = \mathbf{e}_1(t) \times \mathbf{e}_2(t)$$
or to
$$\mathbf{e}_3(t) = -\mathbf{e}_1(t) \times \mathbf{e}_2(t).$$
That either sign may occur is illustrated by the examples of a right-handed helix and a left-handed helix.

=== Torsion ===
The second generalized curvature χ_{2}(t) is called torsion and measures the deviance of γ from being a plane curve. In other words, if the torsion is zero, the curve lies completely in the same osculating plane (there is only one osculating plane for every point t). It is defined as
$$\tau(t) = \chi_2(t) = \frac{\bigl\langle \mathbf{e}_2'(t), \mathbf{e}_3(t) \bigr\rangle}{\left\| \boldsymbol{\gamma}'(t) \right\|}$$
and is called the torsion of γ at point t.

=== Aberrancy ===
The third derivative may be used to define aberrancy, a metric of non-circularity of a curve. If
$$\gamma(t) = \begin{pmatrix} t \\ f(t) \end{pmatrix}$$
is a parametrization of a curve $\gamma$ for some function $f$, then
$$f'(t) - \frac{1 + (f'(t))^2}{3 (f''(t))^2} f'''(t)$$
is the aberrancy of $\gamma$ at point $t$.

== Main theorem of curve theory ==
Given n − 1 functions:
$$\chi_i \in C^{n-i}([a,b],\R^n) , \quad \chi_i(t) > 0 ,\quad  1 \leq i \leq n-1$$
then there exists a unique (up to transformations using the Euclidean group) C^{n+1}-curve γ that is regular of order n and has the following properties:
$$\begin{align}
\|\gamma'(t)\| &= 1  & t \in [a,b] \\
\chi_i(t) &= \frac{ \langle \mathbf{e}_i'(t), \mathbf{e}_{i+1}(t) \rangle}{\| \boldsymbol{\gamma}'(t) \|}
\end{align}$$
where the set
$$\mathbf{e}_1(t), \ldots, \mathbf{e}_n(t)$$
is the Frenet frame for the curve.

By additionally providing a start t_{0} in I, a starting point p_{0} in $\R^n$ and an initial positive orthonormal Frenet frame {e_{1}, ..., e_{n−1}} with
$$\begin{align}
\boldsymbol{\gamma}(t_0) &= \mathbf{p}_0 \\
\mathbf{e}_i(t_0) &= \mathbf{e}_i ,\quad  1 \leq i \leq n-1
\end{align}$$
the Euclidean transformations are eliminated to obtain a unique curve γ.

== Frenet–Serret formulas ==
The Frenet–Serret formulas are a set of ordinary differential equations of first order. The solution is the set of Frenet vectors describing the curve specified by the generalized curvature functions χ_{i}.

=== 2 dimensions ===
$$\begin{bmatrix}
\mathbf{e}_1'(t) \\ \mathbf{e}_2'(t)
\end{bmatrix}
=
\left\Vert \gamma'(t) \right\Vert
\begin{bmatrix}
0  & \kappa(t) \\
-\kappa(t) &         0 \\
\end{bmatrix}
\begin{bmatrix}
\mathbf{e}_1(t) \\ \mathbf{e}_2(t)
\end{bmatrix}$$

=== 3 dimensions ===
$$\begin{bmatrix}
\mathbf{e}_1'(t) \\[0.75ex]
\mathbf{e}_2'(t) \\[0.75ex]
\mathbf{e}_3'(t)
\end{bmatrix}
=
\left\Vert \gamma'(t) \right\Vert
\begin{bmatrix}
0 &  \kappa(t) &       0 \\[1ex]
-\kappa(t) &          0 & \tau(t) \\[1ex]
0 &   -\tau(t) &       0
\end{bmatrix}
\begin{bmatrix}
\mathbf{e}_1(t) \\[1ex]
\mathbf{e}_2(t) \\[1ex]
\mathbf{e}_3(t)
\end{bmatrix}$$

=== n dimensions (general formula) ===
$$\begin{bmatrix}
\mathbf{e}_1'(t) \\[1ex]
\mathbf{e}_2'(t) \\[1ex]
\vdots \\[1ex]
\mathbf{e}_{n-1}'(t) \\[1ex]
\mathbf{e}_n'(t) \\[1ex]
\end{bmatrix}
=
\left\Vert \gamma'(t) \right\Vert
\begin{bmatrix}
0 &  \chi_1(t) & \cdots &              0 &             0 \\[1ex]
-\chi_1(t) &          0 & \cdots &              0 &             0 \\[1ex]
\vdots &     \vdots & \ddots &         \vdots &        \vdots \\[1ex]
0 &          0 & \cdots &              0 & \chi_{n-1}(t) \\[1ex]
0 &          0 & \cdots & -\chi_{n-1}(t) &             0 \\[1ex]
\end{bmatrix}
\begin{bmatrix}
\mathbf{e}_1(t) \\[1ex]
\mathbf{e}_2(t) \\[1ex]
\vdots \\[1ex]
\mathbf{e}_{n-1}(t) \\[1ex]
\mathbf{e}_n(t) \\[1ex]
\end{bmatrix}$$

== Bertrand curve ==
A Bertrand curve is a regular curve in $\R^3$ with the additional property that there is a second curve in $\R^3$ such that the principal normal vectors to these two curves are identical at each corresponding point. In other words, if γ_{1}(t) and γ_{2}(t) are two curves in $\R^3$ such that for any t, the two principal normals N_{1}(t), N_{2}(t) are equal, then γ_{1} and γ_{2} are Bertrand curves, and γ_{2} is called the Bertrand mate of γ_{1}. We can write γ_{2}(t) = γ_{1}(t) + r N_{1}(t) for some constant r.

According to problem 25 in Kühnel's "Differential Geometry Curves – Surfaces – Manifolds", it is also true that two Bertrand curves that do not lie in the same two-dimensional plane are characterized by the existence of a linear relation a κ(t) + b τ(t) = 1 where κ(t) and τ(t) are the curvature and torsion of γ_{1}(t) and a and b are real constants with a ≠ 0. Furthermore, the product of torsions of a Bertrand pair of curves is constant. If γ_{1} has more than one Bertrand mate then it has infinitely many. This occurs only when γ_{1} is a circular helix.

== See also ==
- List of curves topics
