= Subtangent =

Mathematical concept

Subtangent and related concepts for a curve (black) at a given point P. The tangent and normal lines are shown in green and blue respectively. The distances shown are the ordinate (AP), tangent (TP), subtangent (TA), normal (PN), and subnormal (AN). The angle φ is the angle of inclination of the tangent line or the tangential angle.

In geometry, the subtangent and related terms are certain line segments defined using the line tangent to a curve at a given point and the coordinate axes. The terms are somewhat archaic today but were in common use until the early part of the 20th century.

== Definitions ==
Let P = (x, y) be a point on a given curve with A = (x, 0) its projection onto the x-axis. Draw the tangent to the curve at P and let T be the point where this line intersects the x-axis. Then TA is defined to be the subtangent at P. Similarly, if normal to the curve at P intersects the x-axis at N then AN is called the subnormal. In this context, the lengths PT and PN are called the tangent and normal, not to be confused with the tangent line and the normal line which are also called the tangent and normal.

== Equations ==
Let φ be the angle of inclination of the tangent with respect to the x-axis; this is also known as the tangential angle. Then

$$\tan\varphi=\frac{dy}{dx}=\frac{AP}{TA}=\frac{AN}{AP}.$$

So the subtangent is

$$y\cot\varphi=\frac{y}{\tfrac{dy}{dx}},$$

and the subnormal is

$$y\tan\varphi=y\frac{dy}{dx}.$$

The normal is given by

$$y\sec\varphi=y\sqrt{1+\left(\frac{dy}{dx}\right)^2},$$

and the tangent is given by

$$y\csc\varphi=\frac{y}{\tfrac{dy}{dx}}\sqrt{1+\left(\frac{dy}{dx}\right)^2}.$$

== Polar definitions ==
Polar subtangent and related concepts for a curve (black) at a given point P. The tangent and normal lines are shown in green and blue respectively. The distances shown are the radius (OP), polar subtangent (OT), and polar subnormal (ON). The angle θ is the radial angle and the angle ψ of inclination of the tangent to the radius or the polar tangential angle.

Let P = (r, θ) be a point on a given curve defined by polar coordinates and let O denote the origin. Draw a line through O which is perpendicular to OP and let T now be the point where this line intersects the tangent to the curve at P. Similarly, let N now be the point where the normal to the curve intersects the line. Then OT and ON are, respectively, called the polar subtangent and polar subnormal of the curve at P.

== Polar equations ==
Let ψ be the angle between the tangent and the ray OP; this is also known as the polar tangential angle. Then

$$\tan\psi=\frac{r}{\tfrac{dr}{d\theta}}=\frac{OP}{ON}=\frac{OT}{OP}.$$

So the polar subtangent is

$$r\tan\psi=\frac{r^2}{\tfrac{dr}{d\theta}},$$

and the subnormal is

$$r\cot\psi=\frac{dr}{d\theta}.$$
