= Darboux basis =

A Darboux basis may refer to:

- A Darboux basis of a symplectic vector space
- In differential geometry, a Darboux frame on a surface
- A Darboux tangent in the dovetail joint
