= Jean Frédéric Frenet =

French mathematician, astronomer, and meteorologist

- Born: 7 February 1816; Périgueux, France
- Died: 12 June 1900 (aged 84); Périgueux, France
- Known for: Frenet–Serret formulas
- Scientific career
- Fields: Mathematics; Astronomy; Meteorology

Jean Frédéric Frenet (French: [fʁənɛ]; 7 February 1816 – 12 June 1900) was a French mathematician, astronomer, and meteorologist. He was born and died in Périgueux, France.

He is best known for being an independent co-discoverer of the Frenet–Serret formulas. He wrote six out of the nine formulas, which at that time were not expressed in vector notation. These formulas are important in the theory of space curves (differential geometry), and they were presented in his doctoral thesis at Toulouse in 1847. That year he became a professor at Toulouse, and one year later, 1848, he became professor of mathematics at Lyon. He also was director of an astronomical observatory at Lyon. Four years later, in 1852, he published the Frenet formulas in the Journal de Mathématiques Pures et Appliquées.

In 1856 his calculus primer was first published, which ran through seven editions, the last one published posthumously in 1917.
