= Goursat problem =

Partial differential equations with data on two intersecting characteristics

The Goursat problem (also called the Darboux problem) is a boundary value problem for a second-order hyperbolic partial differential equation (PDE) in two independent variables, with data prescribed on two characteristic curves issuing from a common point. The problem is named after Édouard Goursat and is closely related to the Cauchy problem.

== Definition ==
For the second-order hyperbolic differential equation

$$u_{xy}=F(x, y, u, p, q), \qquad p=u_x, \qquad q=u_y$$	1

given, for example, in the domain $\Omega=\{(x, y): 0<x<y<1\}$, Goursat's problem is posed as follows: To find a solution $u(x, y)$ of equation (1) that is:

- regular in $\Omega$
- continuous in the closure $\bar{\Omega}$
- satisfying given data on the boundary

$$u(0, t)=\phi(t), \qquad u(t, 1)=\psi(t), \qquad \phi(1)=\psi(0), \qquad 0 \le t \le 1,$$	2

where $\phi$ and $\psi$ are given continuously differentiable functions.

Boundary conditions for the Goursat problem.

If $F$

- is continuous for all $(x, y) \in \bar{\Omega}$ and any real values of $u,p,q$,
- and has derivatives $F_u, F_p, F_q$ whose absolute values are uniformly bounded under these conditions,

then a unique and stable solution of the problem (1), (2) exists in $\Omega$.

== Riemann method ==
The linear case of Goursat's problem,

$$L u \equiv u_{xy}+a\,u_x+b\,u_y+c\,u=f$$	3

can be solved by the Riemann method.

Define the Riemann function $R(x, y ; \xi, \eta)$ as the unique solution of the equation

$$R_{xy}-(a R)_x-(b R)_y+c R=0$$	4

that, on the characteristics $x=\xi$ and $y=\eta$, satisfies the condition

$$\begin{aligned} & R(\xi, y ; \xi, \eta)=\exp\!\left(\int_\eta^y a(\xi, t)\,dt\right),\\ & R(x, \eta ; \xi, \eta)=\exp\!\left(\int_{\xi}^x b(t, \eta)\,dt\right). \end{aligned}$$	5

Here $(\xi, \eta)$ is an arbitrary point in the domain $\Omega$ in which equation (3) is defined. If the functions $a_x, b_y$ and $c$ are continuous, then the Riemann function exists and is, with respect to the variables $\xi$ and $\eta$, the solution of $L R=0$.

The solution of Goursat's problem (2) for equation (3) is given by the Riemann formula. If $\phi=\psi \equiv 0$, it has the form:

$$u(x, y)=\int_0^x\!\! d \xi \int_1^y\!\! R(\xi, \eta ; x, y)\, f(\xi, \eta)\, d \eta$$	6

It follows from Riemann's formula that at any $(x_0, y_0) \in \Omega$, the solution value $u(x_0, y_0)$ depends only on the value of the given functions in the characteristic quadrilateral $0 \le x \le x_0$, $0 \le y \le y_0$. If $f \equiv 0$, this value depends only on the values of $\psi(x)$ and $\phi(y)$ in the intervals $0 \le x \le x_0$ and $0 \le y \le y_0$, respectively, while if $a=b=c=f \equiv 0$, the function has the form

$$u(x_0, y_0)=\phi(y_0)+\psi(x_0)-\phi(0)$$	7

The method has been extended to a fairly wide class of hyperbolic systems of orders one and two—in particular, to systems of the form (3) where $a, b$ and $c$ are quadratic symmetric matrices of order $n$, while $f$ and $u$ are vectors with $n$ components.

== Darboux–Picard problem ==
A direct generalization of Goursat's problem is the Darboux–Picard problem: to find the solution of a hyperbolic equation, or a second-order hyperbolic system, in two independent variables from its given values on two smooth monotone curves $\gamma$ and $\delta$, issuing from the same point $A$ and located in the characteristic angle with apex at $A$. In particular, $\gamma$ and $\delta$ may partly or wholly coincide with the sides of this angle.

This problem has been studied for equations of the form (1). Goursat's problem is sometimes referred to as the Darboux problem. The Goursat problem for hyperbolic equations of order two in several independent variables is often understood to be the characteristic problem, viz. to find its solution from given values on the characteristic conoid.

== See also ==
- Boundary value problem
- Cauchy problem
- Hyperbolic partial differential equation
