= Osculating plane =

Geometrical plane which second-order contacts a submanifold

A space curve, Frenet–Serret frame, and the osculating plane (spanned by T and N).

In mathematics, particularly in differential geometry, an osculating plane is a plane in a Euclidean space or affine space which meets a submanifold at a point in such a way as to have a second order of contact at the point. The word osculate is from Latin osculari 'to kiss'; an osculating plane is thus a plane which "kisses" a submanifold.

The osculating plane in the geometry of Euclidean space curves can be described in terms of the Frenet-Serret formulas as the linear span of the tangent and normal vectors.

== See also ==
- Normal plane (geometry)
- Osculating circle
- Differential geometry of curves § Special Frenet vectors and generalized curvatures
