= Tangent vector =

Vector tangent to a curve or surface at a given point

In mathematics, a tangent vector is a vector that is tangent to a curve or surface at a given point. Tangent vectors are described in the differential geometry of curves in the context of curves in R^{n}. More generally, tangent vectors are elements of a tangent space of a differentiable manifold. Tangent vectors can also be described in terms of germs. Formally, a tangent vector at the point $x$ is a linear derivation of the algebra defined by the set of germs at $x$.

== Motivation ==
Before proceeding to a general definition of the tangent vector, we discuss its use in calculus and its tensor properties.

=== Calculus ===
Let $\mathbf{r}(t)$ be a parametric smooth curve. The tangent vector is given by $\mathbf{r}'(t)$ provided it exists and provided $\mathbf{r}'(t)\neq \mathbf{0}$, where we have used a prime instead of the usual dot to indicate differentiation with respect to parameter t. The unit tangent vector is given by
$$\mathbf{T}(t) = \frac{\mathbf{r}'(t)}{|\mathbf{r}'(t)|}\,.$$

==== Example ====
Given the curve
$$\mathbf{r}(t) = \left\{\left(1+t^2, e^{2t}, \cos{t}\right) \mid t\in\R\right\}$$
in $\R^3$, the unit tangent vector at $t = 0$ is given by
$$\mathbf{T}(0) = \frac{\mathbf{r}'(0)}{\|\mathbf{r}'(0)\|} = \left.\frac{(2t, 2e^{2t}, -\sin{t})}{\sqrt{4t^2 + 4e^{4t} + \sin^2{t}}}\right|_{t=0} = (0,1,0)\,.$$
Where the components of the tangent vector are found by taking the derivative of each corresponding component of the curve with respect to $t$.

=== Contravariance ===
If $\mathbf{r}(t)$ is given parametrically in the n-dimensional coordinate system x^{i} (here we have used superscripts as an index instead of the usual subscript) by $\mathbf{r}(t) = (x^1(t), x^2(t), \ldots, x^n(t))$ or
$$\mathbf{r} = x^i = x^i(t), \quad a\leq t\leq b\,,$$
then the tangent vector field $\mathbf{T} = T^i$ is given by
$$T^i = \frac{dx^i}{dt}\,.$$
Under a change of coordinates
$$u^i = u^i(x^1, x^2, \ldots, x^n), \quad 1\leq i\leq n$$
the tangent vector $\bar{\mathbf{T}} = \bar{T}^i$ in the u^{i}-coordinate system is given by
$$\bar{T}^i = \frac{du^i}{dt} = \frac{\partial u^i}{\partial x^s} \frac{dx^s}{dt} = T^s \frac{\partial u^i}{\partial x^s}$$
where we have used the Einstein summation convention. Therefore, a tangent vector of a smooth curve will transform as a contravariant tensor of order one under a change of coordinates.

== Definition ==
Let $f: \R^n \to \R$ be a differentiable function and let $\mathbf{v}$ be a vector in $\R^n$. We define the directional derivative in the $\mathbf{v}$ direction at a point $\mathbf{x} \in \R^n$ by
$$\nabla_\mathbf{v} f(\mathbf{x}) = \left.\frac{d}{dt} f(\mathbf{x} + t\mathbf{v})\right|_{t=0} = \sum_{i=1}^{n} v_i \frac{\partial f}{\partial x_i}(\mathbf{x})\,.$$
The tangent vector at the point $\mathbf{x}$ may then be defined as
$$\mathbf{v}(f(\mathbf{x})) \equiv (\nabla_\mathbf{v}(f)) (\mathbf{x})\,.$$

== Properties ==
Let $f,g:\mathbb{R}^n\to\mathbb{R}$ be differentiable functions, let $\mathbf{v},\mathbf{w}$ be tangent vectors in $\mathbb{R}^n$ at $\mathbf{x}\in\mathbb{R}^n$, and let $a,b\in\mathbb{R}$. Then

1. $(a\mathbf{v}+b\mathbf{w})(f)=a\mathbf{v}(f)+b\mathbf{w}(f)$
2. $\mathbf{v}(af+bg)=a\mathbf{v}(f)+b\mathbf{v}(g)$
3. $\mathbf{v}(fg)=f(\mathbf{x})\mathbf{v}(g)+g(\mathbf{x})\mathbf{v}(f)\,.$

== Tangent vector on manifolds ==
Let $M$ be a differentiable manifold and let $A(M)$ be the algebra of real-valued differentiable functions on $M$. Then the tangent vector to $M$ at a point $x$ in the manifold is given by the derivation $D_v:A(M)\rightarrow\mathbb{R}$ which shall be linear — i.e., for any $f,g\in A(M)$ and $a,b\in\mathbb{R}$ we have

$$D_v(af+bg)=aD_v(f)+bD_v(g)\,.$$

Note that the derivation will by definition have the Leibniz property

$$D_v(f\cdot g)(x)=D_v(f)(x)\cdot g(x)+f(x)\cdot D_v(g)(x)\,.$$

== See also ==
- Differentiable curve § Tangent vector
- Differentiable surface § Tangent plane and normal vector

== Bibliography ==
- Gray, Alfred (1993), Modern Differential Geometry of Curves and Surfaces, Boca Raton: CRC Press.
- Stewart, James (2001), Calculus: Concepts and Contexts, Australia: Thomson/Brooks/Cole.
- Kay, David (1988), Schaums Outline of Theory and Problems of Tensor Calculus, New York: McGraw-Hill.
