= Mingarelli identity =

Criteria for the oscillation and non-oscillation of some linear differential equations

In the field of ordinary differential equations, the Mingarelli identity is a theorem that provides criteria for the oscillation and non-oscillation of solutions of some linear differential equations in the real domain. It extends the Picone identity from two to three or more differential equations of the second order.

== The identity ==
Consider the n solutions of the following (uncoupled) system of second order linear differential equations over the t–interval [a, b]:

$(p_i(t) x_i^\prime)^\prime + q_i(t) x_i = 0, \,\,\,\,\,\,\,\,\,\, x_i(a)=1,\,\, x_i^\prime(a)=R_i$ where $i=1,2, \ldots, n$.

Let $\Delta$ denote the forward difference operator, i.e.

$$\Delta x_i = x_{i+1}-x_i.$$

The second order difference operator is found by iterating the first order operator as in

$$\Delta^2 (x_i) = \Delta(\Delta x_i) = x_{i+2}-2x_{i+1}+x_{i},$$,

with a similar definition for the higher iterates. Leaving out the independent variable t for convenience, and assuming the x_{i}(t) ≠ 0 on (a, b], there holds the identity,

$$\begin{align}
x_{n-1}^2\Delta^{n-1}(p_1r_1)]_a^b = &\int_a^b (x^\prime_{n-1})^2 \Delta^{n-1}(p_1) - \int_a^b x_{n-1}^2 \Delta^{n-1}(q_1) \\
&- \sum_{k=0}^{n-1} C(n-1,k)(-1)^{n-k-1}\int_a^b p_{k+1} W^2(x_{k+1},x_{n-1})/x_{k+1}^2,
\end{align}$$

where

- $r_i = x^\prime_i/x_i$ is the logarithmic derivative,
- $W(x_i, x_j) = x^\prime_ix_j - x_ix^\prime_j$, is the Wronskian determinant,
- $C(n-1,k)$ are binomial coefficients.

When n = 2 this equality reduces to the Picone identity.

== An application ==
The above identity leads quickly to the following comparison theorem for three linear differential equations, which extends the classical Sturm–Picone comparison theorem.

Let p_{i}, q_{i} i = 1, 2, 3, be real-valued continuous functions on the interval [a, b] and let

1. $(p_1(t) x_1^\prime)^\prime + q_1(t) x_1 = 0, \,\,\,\,\,\,\,\,\,\, x_1(a)=1,\,\, x_1^\prime(a)=R_1$
2. $(p_2(t) x_2^\prime)^\prime + q_2(t) x_2 = 0, \,\,\,\,\,\,\,\,\,\, x_2(a)=1,\,\, x_2^\prime(a)=R_2$
3. $(p_3(t) x_3^\prime)^\prime + q_3(t) x_3 = 0, \,\,\,\,\,\,\,\,\,\, x_3(a)=1,\,\, x_3^\prime(a)=R_3$

be three homogeneous linear second order differential equations in self-adjoint form, where

- p_{i}(t) > 0 for each i and for all t in [a, b] , and
- the R_{i} are arbitrary real numbers.

Assume that for all t in [a, b] we have,

$$\Delta^2(q_1) \ge 0$$,
$$\Delta^2(p_1) \le 0$$,
$$\Delta^2(p_1(a)R_1) \le 0$$.

Then, if x_{1}(t) > 0 on [a, b] and x_{2}(b) = 0, then any solution x_{3}(t) has at least one zero in [a, b].
