= Gianfranco Cimmino =

Italian mathematician

- Born: 12 March 1908; Naples, Italy
- Died: 30 May 1989 (aged 81); Bologna, Italy
- Education: University of Naples Federico II
- Known for: Distribution theory; Numerical solution of linear systems of equations; Theory of elliptic partial differential equations; Weak formulation of boundary values
- Scientific career
- Fields: Mathematical analysis; Numerical analysis; Theory of elliptic partial differential equations
- Workplaces: University of Naples Federico II; Istituto Nazionale di Alta Matematica Francesco Severi; University of Bologna
- Doctoral advisor: Mauro Picone

Gianfranco Cimmino (12 March 1908 – 30 May 1989) was an Italian mathematician, working mathematical analysis, numerical analysis, and theory of elliptic partial differential equations: he is known for being the first mathematician generalizing in a weak sense the notion of boundary value in a boundary value problem, and for doing an influential work in numerical analysis.

== Selected works ==
=== Scientific works ===
==== Scientific papers ====
- Cimmino, Gianfranco (1938), "Calcolo approssimato per le soluzioni dei sistemi di equazioni lineari", La Ricerca Scientifica ed Il Progresso Tecnico Nell'economia Nazionale, Serie II (in Italian), 1: 326–333, JFM 64.1244.02, Zbl 0018.41802. An English translation is available as Cimmino, Gianfranco (2022), "Approximate Computation of the Solutions of Systems of Linear Equations" (PDF), Rendiconto dell'Accademia delle Scienze Fisiche e Matematiche, Napoli, Serie IV, LXXXIX (CLXI): 65–72, doi:10.32092/1096, Zbl 1522.65042.
- Cimmino, Gianfranco (1988), "A conjecture on minimal surfaces", Atti della Accademia Nazionale dei Lincei. Rendiconti. Classe di Scienze Fisiche, Matematiche e Naturali, Serie VIII (in Italian), LXXXII (4): 639–644, MR 1139810, Zbl 0747.53009.
- Cimmino, Gianfranco (1989), "On some identities involving spherical means", Atti della Accademia Nazionale dei Lincei. Rendiconti. Classe di Scienze Fisiche, Matematiche e Naturali, Serie VIII (in Italian), LXXXIII (4): 69–72, MR 1142440, Zbl 0734.15009.

==== Books ====
- Cimmino, Gianfranco (2002), Sbordone, Carlo; Trombetti, Guido (eds.), Opere scelte [Selected works], Memorie (in Italian), vol. 10, Naples: Giannini Editore, pp. XV+670. Gianfranco Cimmino's "Selected works", edited under the auspices of the Accademia Pontaniana and of the Academy of Physical and Mathematical Sciences of the Società Nazionale di Scienze Lettere e Arti in Napoli.

=== Commemorative, historical, and survey works ===
- Cimmino, Gianfranco; Scorza Dragoni, Giuseppe (1984), "L'opera Matematica di Carlo Miranda" [The mathematical work of Carlo Miranda], Atti della Accademia Nazionale dei Lincei. Rendiconti. Classe di Scienze Fisiche, Matematiche e Naturali, Series VIII (in Italian), LXXVI (2): 145–157, ISSN 0392-7881, MR 0814350.
- Cimmino, Giafranco (1986), "Indirizzo di adesione", in Montalenti, G.; Amerio, L.; Acquaro, G.; Baiada, E.; et al. (eds.), Convegno celebrativo del centenario della nascita di Mauro Picone e Leonida Tonelli (6–9 maggio 1985), Atti dei Convegni Lincei (in Italian), vol. 77, Rome: Accademia Nazionale dei Lincei, pp. 14–15, archived from the original on 2011-02-23. The "participating address" presented to the International congress on the occasion of the celebration of the centenary of birth of Mauro Picone and Leonida Tonelli (held in Rome on May 6–9, 1985) by Gianfranco Cimmino on behalf of the Accademia delle Scienze dell'Istituto di Bologna.

== See also ==
- Luigi Amerio
- Hyperfunction

== Sources ==
=== Biographical references ===
- Accademia Nazionale dei Lincei (2012), Annuario dell'Accademia Nazionale dei Lincei 2012 – CDX dalla Sua Fondazione (PDF) (in Italian), Rome: Accademia Nazionale dei Lincei, p. 734, archived from the original (PDF) on 2016-03-04. The "Yearbook" of the renowned Italian scientific institution, including an historical sketch of its history, the list of all past and present members as well as a wealth of information about its academic and scientific activities.
- Accademia Pontaniana (2015), Annuario della Accademia Pontaniana 2015 (DLXXIII dalla fondazione) (PDF) (in Italian), Naples: Nella Sede dell'Accademia, p. 180, archived from the original (PDF) on 2015-03-06. The "Yearbook 2015" of the Accademia Pontaniana, published by the Academy itself and describing its past and present hierarchies and its activities. It also gives some notes on its history, the full list of its and other useful information.
- Barbieri, Francesco; Taddei, Ferdinando (2006), L'Accademia di Scienze, Lettere e Arti di Modena dalle origini (1683) al 2005. Tomo I – La storia e i soci (PDF) (in Italian), Modena: Mucchi Editore, p. 359, ISBN 88-7000-419-8, archived from the original (PDF) on 2015-11-06. The first part ("Tomo") of an extensive work on the "Accademia di Scienze, Lettere e Arti di Modena", reporting the history of the academy and biographies of members up to the year 2006.
- Miranda, Carlo (1978), "Breve storia e prospettive future dell'istituto di matematica della facolta di scienze dell'universita di Napoli", Rendiconto dell'Accademia delle Scienze Fisiche e Matematiche, Napoli, Serie IV (in Italian), 44 (1977): 7–44, MR 0497758, Zbl 0384.01020.
- Ridolfi, Roberto, ed. (1976), "Gianfranco Cimmino", Biografie e bibliografie degli Accademici Lincei [Biographies and bibliographies of the Lincean Academicians] (in Italian), Rome: Accademia Nazionale dei Lincei, pp. 223–225. The biographical and bibliographical entry (updated up to 1976) on Gianfranco Cimmino, published under the auspices of the Accademia dei Lincei in a book collecting many profiles of its members living members up to 1976.
- Roghi, Gino (December 2005), "Materiale per una storia dell'Istituto Nazionale di Alta Matematica dal 1939 to 2003.", Bollettino dell'Unione Matematica Italiana, Sezione A, La Matematica nella Società e nella Cultura, Serie VIII (in Italian), 8-A (3, parte 2): x+301, MR 2225078, Zbl 1089.01500. This is a monographic fascicle published on the "Bollettino dell'Unione Matematica Italiana", describing the history of the Istituto Nazionale di Alta Matematica Francesco Severi from its foundation in 1939 to 2003: an English translation of the title reads as:-"Materials toward a history of the Istituto Nazionale di Alta Matematica from 1939 to 2003". It was written by Gino Roghi and includes a presentation by Salvatore Coen and a preface by Corrado De Concini. It is almost exclusively based on sources from the institute archives: the wealth and variety of materials included, jointly with its appendices and indexes, make this monograph a useful reference not only for the history of the institute itself, but also for the history of many mathematicians who taught or followed the institute courses or simply worked there.
- Sbordone, Carlo; Trombetti, Guido (2002), Introduzione (in Italian), p. IX of the book (Cimmino 2002). The short "Introduction" to Cimmino's selected works by its editors: it includes also a few biographical data.
- Società Nazionale di Scienze Lettere e Arti in Napoli (2014), Annuario della Società Nazionale di Scienze Lettere e Arti in Napoli – 2014 (PDF) (in Italian), Naples: Società Nazionale di Scienze Lettere e Arti in Napoli, p. 82, archived from the original (PDF) on 2016-03-03. The "Yearbook 2014" of the Società Nazionale di Scienze Lettere e Arti in Napoli, published by the society itself and describing its past and present hierarchies, and its activities. It also reports some notes on its history, the full list of its members and other useful information.

=== General references ===
- Pini, Bruno (1991), "Gianfranco Cimmino", Bollettino dell'Unione Matematica Italiana, Sezione A, Serie VII (in Italian), 18 (2): 117–123, MR 1101018, Zbl 0719.01021.
- Sbordone, Carlo (2008), "Commemorazione di Gianfranco Cimmino (1908–1989) nel centenario della nascita" [Commemoration of Gianfranco Cimmino (1908–1989) on the centenary of his birth] (PDF), Atti della Accademia Pontaniana, Nuova Serie (in Italian), LVII: 7–16, ISSN 1121-9238.
- Scorza Dragoni, Giuseppe (1991), "Gianfranco Cimmino (12 marzo 1908 – 30 maggio 1989)", Atti della Accademia Nazionale dei Lincei. Classe di Scienze Fisiche, Matematiche e Naturali. Rendiconti Lincei. Supplemento, Serie IX, 2 (1): 9–14, MR 1179475, Zbl 0752.01026.

=== Scientific references ===
- Benzi, Michele (2005), "Gianfranco Cimmino's Contributions to Numerical Mathematics", in Pini, Bruno (ed.), Atti del Seminario di Analisi Matematica, Dipartimento di Matematica dell'Università di Bologna. Volume Speciale: Ciclo di Conferenze in Memoria di Gianfranco Cimmino, Marzo-Aprile 2004, Bologna: Tecnoprint, pp. 87–109. See here Archived 2016-02-21 at the Wayback Machine for a preprint version of the original paper downloadable from the author's academic home page.
- Benzi, Michele (2022), "Gianfranco Cimmino's Contributions to Numerical Mathematics" (PDF), Rendiconto dell'Accademia delle Scienze Fisiche e Matematiche, Napoli, Serie IV, LXXXIX (CLXI): 73–98, doi:10.32092/1097, Zbl 1522.65005.
- Caraman, Petru (1974) [1968], n–Dimensional Quasiconformal (QCf) Mappings (revised ed.), București / Tunbridge Wells, Kent: Editura Academiei / Abacus Press, p. 553, ISBN 0-85626-005-3, MR 0357782, Zbl 0342.30015.
- Magenes, Enrico (2002), "Ricordo di Gianfranco Cimmino", in Cimmino, Gianfranco (ed.), Opere scelte, Memorie (in Italian), vol. 10, Naples: Giannini Editore, pp. XI–XV.
- Miranda, Carlo (1955), Equazioni alle derivate parziali di tipo ellittico, Ergebnisse der Mathematik und ihrer Grenzgebiete – Neue Folge (in Italian), vol. Heft 2 (1st ed.), Berlin – Göttingen – New York: Springer Verlag, pp. VIII+222, MR 0087853, Zbl 0065.08503.
- Miranda, Carlo (1970) [1955], Partial Differential Equations of Elliptic Type, Ergebnisse der Mathematik und ihrer Grenzgebiete – 2 Folge, vol. Band 2, translated by Motteler, Zane C. (2nd Revised ed.), Berlin – Heidelberg – New York: Springer Verlag, pp. XII+370, ISBN 978-3-540-04804-6, MR 0284700, Zbl 0198.14101.
