= Mingarelli =

Mingarelli is a surname of Italian origin.

== People with the surname ==
- Chiara Mingarelli, Italian-Canadian astrophysicist
- Giovanna Mingarelli, Canadian politician
- Giovanni Luigi Mingarelli (1722–1793), Italian scholar
- Hubert Mingarelli (1956–2020), French writer

== See also ==
- Mingarelli identity
- Atkinson–Mingarelli theorem
