= Lamberto Cesari =

Italian mathematician (1910–1990)

- Born: 23 September 1910; Bologna, Italy
- Died: 12 March 1990 (aged 79); Ann Arbor, Michigan, U.S.
- Citizenship: United States
- Education: Scuola Normale Superiore
- Known for: Functions of bounded variation: Nonlinear functional analysis; Theory of surface area
- Scientific career
- Fields: Geometric measure theory; Mathematical analysis; Functional analysis; Calculus of variation
- Workplaces: Istituto Nazionale per le Applicazioni del Calcolo; Università di Pisa; Università di Bologna; University of Michigan
- Doctoral advisor: Leonida Tonelli
- Other academic advisors: Constantin Carathéodory; Mauro Picone
- Doctoral students: Jack K. Hale

Lamberto Cesari (23 September 1910 – 12 March 1990) was an Italian mathematician naturalized in the United States, known for his work on the theory of surface area, the theory of functions of bounded variation, the theory of optimal control and on the stability theory of dynamical systems: in particular, by extending the concept of Tonelli plane variation, he succeeded in introducing the class of functions of bounded variation of several variables in its full generality.

== Biography ==
In 1933, he was awarded his laurea degree at the Scuola Normale Superiore in Pisa under the direction of Leonida Tonelli. After a period of study from 1934 to 1935 in Germany at Monaco di Baviera under the direction of Constantin Carathéodory, he went back to Pisa at the Scuola Normale Superiore for a year, and then to Rome at the Istituto Nazionale per le Applicazioni del Calcolo, at the time directed by Mauro Picone.

From 1938 to 1946 he went back as a professore incaricato at Pisa University: in 1947 he was at the University of Bologna as a professor of mathematical analysis.

In 1948 he went to the United States as a visiting professor at the Institute for Advanced Study in Princeton, at Purdue University in Lafayette, at the University of California - Berkeley and at the University of Wisconsin–Madison.

In 1960 he was appointed as a professor of mathematical analysis at the University of Michigan at Ann Arbor where he remained until his retirement in 1981. In 1976 he became a citizen of the United States, while keeping close scientific contacts with the Italian mathematical community.

=== The Lamberto Cesari chair ===
The department of Mathematics at the University of Michigan honoured the memory of Lamberto Cesari with the creation of a professorship chair.

== Work ==
=== Research activity ===
He is remembered for his achievements on the Plateau's problem, on the theory of parametric minimal surfaces, on Lebesgue measure of continuous and related other variational problems: he also worked in the field of optimal control and studied periodic solutions of systems of nonlinear ordinary differential equations by using methods of nonlinear functional analysis. In the paper (Cesari 1936) he introduced a generalization of functions of bounded variation to the multi-dimensional setting, now acknowledged as the most versatile of such generalizations. He wrote about 250 scientific works on topics such as non linear functional analysis, measure theory, optimal control: his published works include the fundamental monographs (Cesari 1956), (Cesari 1971) and (Cesari 1983).

== Selected publications ==
=== Papers ===
==== Scientific papers ====
- Cesari, Lamberto (1936), "Sulle funzioni a variazione limitata" [On the functions of bounded variation], Annali della Scuola Normale Superiore, Serie II (in Italian), 5 (3–4): 299–313, MR 1556778, Zbl 0014.29605. Available at Numdam. In this paper, Cesari extends the now called Tonelli plane variation concept in order to include a subclass of the class of integrable functions.
- Cesari, Lamberto (April 1950), "On the Representation of Surfaces", American Journal of Mathematics, 72 (2): 335–346, doi:10.2307/2372037, JSTOR 2372037, MR 0034450, Zbl 0036.03203.

==== Biographical, historical and survey papers ====
- Cesari, Lamberto (May 1950), "Area and representation of surfaces", Bulletin of the American Mathematical Society, 56 (3): 218–232, doi:10.1090/S0002-9904-1950-09371-9, MR 0036296, Zbl 0037.32301
- Cesari, Lamberto; Rado, Tibor (1952), "Applications of area theory in analysis" (PDF), Proceedings of the International Congress of Mathematicians, 1950. Volume II, Conference in Algebra, Conference in Analysis, Conference in Applied Mathematics, Conference in Topology, ICM Proceedings, Providence, R.I.: American Mathematical Society, pp. 174–179, MR 0044623, Zbl 0049.04003.
- Cesari, Lamberto (1954), "Retraction, homotopy, integral" (PDF), Proceedings of the International Congress of Mathematicians, 1954. Volume III, ICM Proceedings, Amsterdam–Groningen: Erven P. Noordhoff N.V. / North-Holland Publishing Company, pp. 77–84, MR 0086861, Zbl 0073.04401.
- Cesari, Lamberto (1986), "L'opera di Leonida Tonelli e la sua influenza nel pensiero scientifico del secolo", in Montalenti, G.; Amerio, L.; Acquaro, G.; Baiada, E.; et al. (eds.), Convegno celebrativo del centenario della nascita di Mauro Picone e Leonida Tonelli (6–9 maggio 1985), Atti dei Convegni Lincei (in Italian), vol. 77, Roma: Accademia Nazionale dei Lincei, pp. 41–73, archived from the original on 23 February 2011. "The work of Leonida Tonelli and his influence on scientific thinking in this century" (English translation of the title) is an ample commemorative article, reporting recollections of the Author about teachers and colleagues, and a detailed survey of his and their scientific work, presented at the International congress in occasion of the celebration of the centenary of birth of Mauro Picone and Leonida Tonelli (held in Rome on May 6–9, 1985).

=== Books ===
- Cesari, Lamberto (1956), Surface Area, Annals of Mathematics Studies, vol. 35, Princeton, New Jersey: Princeton University Press, pp. x+595, ISBN 978-0-691-09585-1, MR 0074500, Zbl 0073.04101. His work summarizing the theory of surface area, including his own contributions.
- Cesari, Lamberto (1971), Asymptotic behavior and stability problems in ordinary differential equations, Ergebnisse Der Mathematik Und Ihrer Grenzgebiete, vol. 16 (3rd ed.), Berlin-Heidelberg-New York City: Springer-Verlag, pp. ix+271, ISBN 978-0-387-05435-3, MR 0350089, Zbl 0082.07602
- Cesari, Lamberto (1983), Optimization-Theory and Applications. Problems with ordinary differential equations, Applications of Mathematics, vol. 17, Berlin-Heidelberg-New York City: Springer-Verlag, pp. xiv+542, ISBN 978-0-387-90676-8, MR 0688142, Zbl 0506.49001.

== See also ==
- Bounded variation
- Constantin Carathéodory
- Mauro Picone
- Leonida Tonelli
- Total variation
