= Kneser's theorem =

Kneser's theorem may refer to:

- Kneser's theorem (combinatorics)
- Kneser's theorem (differential equations)

== See also ==
- Tait–Kneser theorem
