= Leimanis =

Surname list

Leimanis is a surname. Notable people with the surname include:

- Aivars Leimanis (born 1958), Latvian ballet dancer
- Aleksandrs Leimanis (1913–1990), Latvian film director
- Eizens Leimanis (1905–1992), Latvian mathematician
- Toms Leimanis (born 1994), Latvian basketball player
