= Picone identity =

In the field of ordinary differential equations, the Picone identity, named after Mauro Picone, is a classical result about homogeneous linear second order differential equations. Since its inception in 1910 it has been used with tremendous success in association with an almost immediate proof of the Sturm comparison theorem, a theorem whose proof took up many pages in Sturm's original memoir of 1836. It is also useful in studying the oscillation of such equations and has been generalized to other type of differential equations and difference equations.

The Picone identity is used to prove the Sturm–Picone comparison theorem.

== Picone identity ==
Suppose that u and v are solutions of the two homogeneous linear second order differential equations in self-adjoint form

$$(p_1(x) u')' + q_1(x) u = 0$$

and

$$(p_2(x) v')' + q_2(x) v = 0.$$

Then, for all x with v(x) ≠ 0, the following identity holds

$$\left(\frac{u}{v}(p_1 u' v - p_2 u v')\right)' = \left(q_2 - q_1\right) u^2 + \left(p_1 - p_2\right)u'^2 + p_2\left(u'-v'\frac{u}{v}\right)^2.$$

=== Proof ===
$\left(\frac{u}{v}(p_1 u' v - p_2 u v')\right)'=\left(u p_1 u' -p_2v'u^2 \frac 1 v \right)' =u'p_1u' +u(p_1 u')' -(p_2v')'u^2 \frac 1 v-p_2 v' 2u u' \frac 1 v +p_2 v' u^2 \frac{v'}{v^2}=$

$= p_1u'^2-2p_2\frac{ u u' v'} v+p_2\frac{u^2 v'^2}{v^2}+u (p_1u')'- (p_2 v')'\frac{u^2}{v}=$

$= p_1u'^2-p_2u'^2+p_2u'^2-2p_2u'\frac {u v'} v+p_2\left(\frac{u v'}{v}\right)^2-u (q_1u)+ (q_2 v)\frac {u^2} v = \left(p_1 - p_2\right)u'^2 + p_2\left(u'-v'\frac{u}{v}\right)^2 + \left(q_2 - q_1\right) u^2$

== Notes ==
- Picone, Mauro (1910). "Sui valori eccezionali di un parametro da cui dipende un'equazione differenziale lineare del secondo ordine". Ann. Scuola Norm. Sup. Pisa. 11: 1–141.
- Swanson, Charles A. (1975). "Picone's Identity". Rendiconti di Matematica. 8 (2): 373–397.
