= Carlo Miranda =

Italian mathematician (1912–1982)

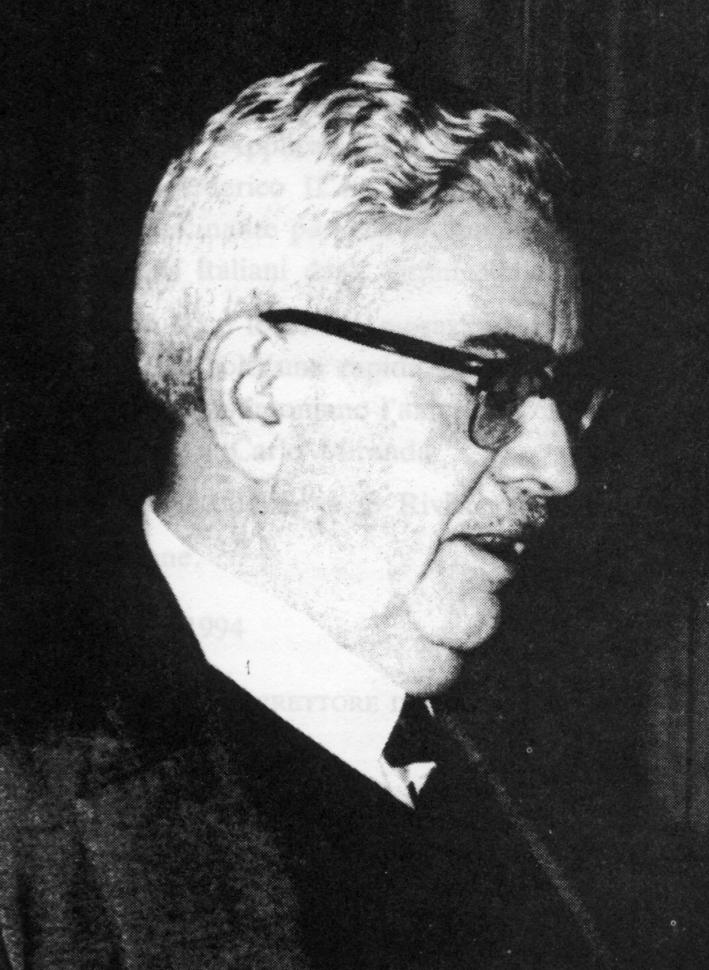
- Born: 15 August 1912; Naples, Kingdom of Italy
- Died: 28 May 1982 (aged 69); Naples, Italy
- Known for: Poincaré–Miranda theorem; Miranda's theorem; Theory of elliptic partial differential equations
- Scientific career
- Fields: Mathematical analysis; Complex analysis; Theory of elliptic partial differential equations
- Institutions: University of Genoa; Polytechnic University of Turin; University of Naples Federico II
- Doctoral advisor: Mauro Picone

Carlo Miranda (15 August 1912 – 28 May 1982) was an Italian mathematician, working on mathematical analysis, theory of elliptic partial differential equations and complex analysis: he is known for giving the first proof of the Poincaré–Miranda theorem, for Miranda's theorem in complex analysis, and for writing an influential monograph in the theory of elliptic partial differential equations.

== Selected works ==
=== Scientific works ===
==== Articles ====
- Miranda, Carlo (27 May 1935), "Un nouveau critère de normalité pour les familles de fonctions holomorphes" [A new normality criterion for families of holomorphic functions], Comptes rendus hebdomadaires des séances de l'Académie des sciences (in French), 200: 1823, ISSN 0001-4036, JFM 61.1154.05, Zbl 0011.31102, available at Gallica.
- Miranda, Carlo (1935a), "Sur un nouveau critère de normalité pour les familles de fonctions holomorphes" [On a new normality criterion for families of holomorphic functions], Bulletin de la Société Mathématique de France (in French), 63: 185–196, doi:10.24033/bsmf.1231, ISSN 0037-9484, JFM 61.1155.01, Zbl 0013.27202, available at NUMDAM.
- Miranda, Carlo (1940), "Un'osservazione su un teorema di Brouwer" [An observation on a theorem of Brouwer], Bollettino dell'Unione Matematica Italiana, Serie 2 (in Italian), 3: 5–7, ISSN 0041-7084, JFM 66.0217.01, MR 0004775, Zbl 0024.02203.

==== Books ====
- Miranda, Carlo (1949), Problemi di esistenza in analisi funzionale [Existence problems in functional analysis], Quaderni (in Italian), vol. 3, Pisa: Litografia Tacchi on behalf of Scuola Normale Superiore, p. ii+184, MR 0037461, Zbl 0041.43401.
- Miranda, Carlo (1955), Equazioni alle derivate parziali di tipo ellittico, Ergebnisse der Mathematik und ihrer Grenzgebiete – Neue Folge (in Italian), vol. Heft 2 (1st ed.), Berlin – Göttingen – New York: Springer Verlag, pp. VIII+222, MR 0087853, Zbl 0065.08503.
- Miranda, Carlo (1970) [1955], Partial Differential Equations of Elliptic Type, Ergebnisse der Mathematik und ihrer Grenzgebiete – 2 Folge, vol. Band 2, translated by Motteler, Zane C. (2nd Revised ed.), Berlin – Heidelberg – New York: Springer Verlag, pp. XII+370, doi:10.1007/978-3-642-87773-5, ISBN 978-3-540-04804-6, MR 0284700, Zbl 0198.14101.
- Miranda, Carlo (1972), Su alcuni problemi di geometria differenziale in grande per gli ovaloidi [On some problems of differential geometry in the large concerning ovaloids], Quaderni (in Italian), Pisa: Edizioni della Normale, p. ii+123, MR 0467615, Zbl 0338.53044.
- Miranda, Carlo (1978), Istituzioni di analisi funzionale lineare [Foundations of linear functional analysis], Monografie Matematiche (in Italian), Bologna: Unione Matematica Italiana, pp. (Vol. I) VIII+596, (Vol. II) 152, Zbl 0697.46001 (and Zbl 0697.46002 for the second volume).
- Miranda, Carlo (1992), Opere scelte [Selected works] (in Italian and French), Florence: Edizioni Cremonese (distributed by Unione Matematica Italiana), pp. XXIV+516 (vol. 1), pp. VIII+517–1066 (vol. 2), ISBN 88-7083-719-X: two volumes collecting his most important mathematical papers in their original language and typographical form, and a full list of Miranda's publications.

=== Commemorative, historical, and survey works ===
- Miranda, Carlo (July–December 1950), "Risultati concernenti la risoluzione delle equazioni funzionali lineari dovuti all'Istituto Nazionale per le Applicazioni del Calcolo" [Results regarding the solution of linear functional equations due to the National Institute for Calculus Applications], Rendiconti di Matematica e delle sue Applicazioni, 5 (in Italian), 9 (3–4): 346–353, ISSN 0034-4427, MR 0041759, Zbl 0040.35304. This work completes a survey of Fichera (1950) with the same title, by elucidating the role of some scientists and adding a further bibliography.
- Miranda, Carlo (1978), "Breve storia e prospettive future dell'istituto di matematica della facolta di scienze dell'universita di Napoli" [Brief history and future perspectives of the institute of mathematics of the faculty of science of the University of Naples] (PDF), Rendiconto dell'Accademia delle Scienze Fisiche e Matematiche, Napoli, Serie IV (in Italian), 44 (1977): 7–44, ISSN 0370-3568, MR 0497758, Zbl 0384.01020.
- Miranda, Carlo (1980–1981), "Federico Cafiero" (PDF), Rendiconto dell'Accademia delle Scienze Fisiche e Matematiche, Napoli, Serie IV (in Italian), 48: 9–16, ISSN 0370-3568, MR 0697874, Zbl 0512.01007.

== See also ==
- Luigi Amerio
- Schottky's theorem
- Singular integral
