= Kneser =

Kneser is a surname. Notable people with the surname include:

- Adolf Kneser (1862–1930), mathematician
- Hellmuth Kneser (1898–1973), mathematician, son of Adolf Kneser
- Martin Kneser (1928–2004), mathematician, son of Hellmuth Kneser
