= Weyrich =

Weyrich is a surname. Notable people with the surname include:

- Nelly Wies-Weyrich (1933–2019), Luxembourgian archer
- Paul Weyrich (1942–2008), American political activist and commentator
- Rudolf Weyrich (1894–1971), German mathematician, physicist, and inventor
