= Adolf Kneser =

German mathematician (1862–1930)

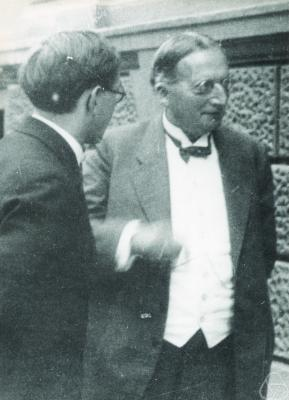
- Adolf Kneser in Prague, Sep.1929
- Born: 19 March 1862; Grüssow, Mecklenburg
- Died: 24 January 1930 (aged 67); Breslau, Silesia
- Education: University of Berlin
- Known for: Four-vertex theorem Kneser's theorem Kneser sequence Tait–Kneser theorem
- Scientific career
- Fields: Mathematics
- Workplaces: University of Breslau
- Doctoral advisor: Leopold Kronecker; Ernst Eduard Kummer
- Doctoral students: Stefan Cohn-Vossen; Rudolf Weyrich
- Other notable students: Alfreds Meders

Adolf Kneser (19 March 1862 – 24 January 1930) was a German mathematician.

He was born in Grüssow, Grand Duchy of Mecklenburg-Schwerin and died in Breslau, Germany.

He is the father of the mathematician Hellmuth Kneser and the grandfather of the mathematician Martin Kneser.

Kneser is known for the first proof of the four-vertex theorem that applied in general to non-convex curves. Kneser's theorem on differential equations is named after him, and provides criteria to decide whether a differential equation is oscillating. He is also one of the namesakes of the Tait–Kneser theorem on osculating circles.

== Selected publications ==
- Über einige fundamentalsätze aus der theorie der algebraischen funktionen von mehreren variabeln. Universitäts-buchdruckerei (R. Friedrich). 1884.
- Lehrbuch der Variationsrechnung. F. Vieweg und Sohn. 1900.; 2nd edition. 1925.
- Die Integralgleichungen und ihre Anwendungen in der mathematischen Physik : Vorlesungen an der Universität zu Breslau. F. Vieweg und Sohn. 1911.; 2nd edition. 1922.
- Theorie der elliptischen funktionen aus den eigenschaften der thetareihen abgeleitet by C. G. J Jacobi. 1927.
- Das Prinzip der kleinsten Wirkung von Leibniz bis zur Gegenwart. 1928.
