= Mauro Picone =

Italian mathematician (1885–1977)

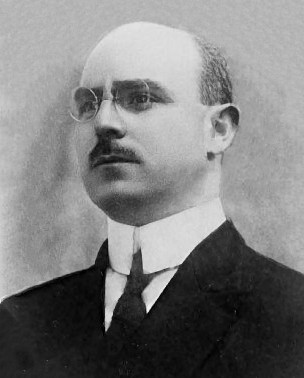
- Mauro Picone
- Born: 2 May 1885; Lercara Friddi, Sicily, Italy
- Died: 11 April 1977 (aged 91); Rome, Italy
- Education: Scuola Normale Superiore (1909)
- Known for: Picone identity; Sturm-Picone comparison theorem
- Scientific career
- Fields: Calculus of variation; numerical analysis; ordinary differential equations; partial differential equations
- Workplaces: University of Cagliari; University of Catania; University of Naples Federico II; Sapienza University of Rome
- Doctoral advisor: Luigi Bianchi
- Doctoral students: Luigi Amerio; Renato Caccioppoli; Gianfranco Cimmino; Ennio De Giorgi; Gaetano Fichera; Carlo Miranda

Mauro Picone (2 May 1885 – 11 April 1977) was an Italian mathematician. He is known for the Picone identity, the Sturm-Picone comparison theorem and being the founder of the Istituto per le Applicazioni del Calcolo, presently named after him, the first applied mathematics institute ever founded. He was also an outstanding teacher of mathematical analysis: some of the best Italian mathematicians were among his pupils.

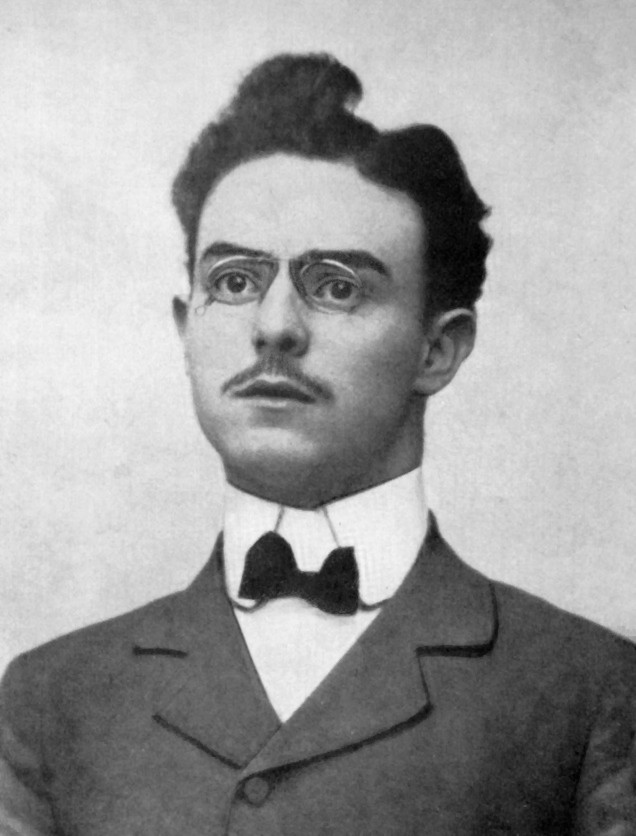
Mauro Picone in 1903

== Work ==
=== Research activity ===
Attraverso le sue ricerche di analisi matematica, Mauro Picone ha contribuito notevolmente allo sviluppo della matematica del nostro secolo. Egli è stato inoltre un pioniere delle matematiche applicate.

— Radu Voinea, (Voinea 1986, p. 38).

=== Teaching activity ===
Notable students:

- Luigi Amerio
- Renato Caccioppoli
- Gianfranco Cimmino
- Ennio De Giorgi
- Gaetano Fichera
- Carlo Miranda

== Selected publications ==
- Picone, Mauro (1923), Lezioni di analisi infinitesimale (PDF), Volume 1 (in Italian), vol. Parte Prima – La Derivazione, Catania: Circolo matematico di Catania, pp. xii+351, JFM 49.0172.07 (Review of the whole volume I) (available from the "Edizione Nazionale Mathematica Italiana"), reviewed by Polvani, P. (December 1924), "MAURO PICONE (Professore d'Analisi superiore all'Università di Pisa) Lezioni di Analisi Infinitesimale", Il Nuovo Cimento (in Italian), 1 (1): 135–136, doi:10.1007/BF02956742, S2CID 117718455.
- Picone, Mauro (1923), Lezioni di analisi infinitesimale (PDF), Volume 1 (in Italian), vol. Parte Seconda – L'Integrazione, Catania: Circolo matematico di Catania, pp. v+352–742, JFM 50.0150.04, (Review of the 2nd part of volume I) (available from the "Edizione Nazionale Mathematica Italiana").
- Picone, Mauro; Viola, Tullio (1952), Lezioni sulla teoria moderna dell'integrazione [Lectures on modern integration theory], Manuali Einaudi. Serie di matematica (in Italian), Turin: Edizioni Scientifiche Einaudi, p. 404, MR 0049983, Zbl 0046.28102, reviewed by Cimmino, Gianfranco (1952), "M. Picone – T. Viola, Lezioni sulla teoria Moderna dell'Integrazione" [Lectures on modern integration theory], Bollettino dell'Unione Matematica Italiana, Serie 3 (in Italian), 7 (4): 452–454 and by Halmos, Paul R. (January 1953), "Review: M. Picone and T. Viola, Lezioni sulla teoria moderna dell'integrazione", Bulletin of the American Mathematical Society, 59 (1): 94, doi:10.1090/S0002-9904-1953-09666-5.

== See also ==
- Renato Caccioppoli
- Lamberto Cesari
- Ennio De Giorgi
- Gaetano Fichera
- Picone identity
- Antonio Signorini
- Sturm-Picone comparison theorem
