= Jean-Daniel Colladon =

Swiss physicist

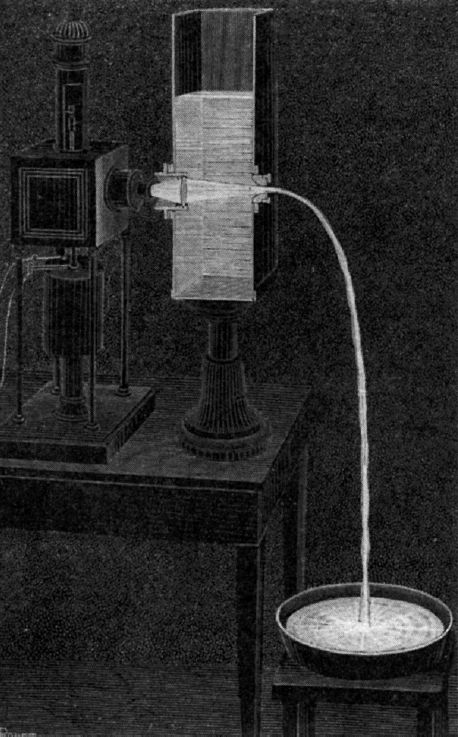
Colladon's "light pipe", as illustrated in an 1884 article

Jean-Daniel Colladon (15 December 1802, Geneva – 30 June 1893) was a Swiss physicist.

Colladon studied law but then worked in the laboratories of Ampère and Fourier. He received an Académie des Sciences award with his friend Charles Sturm for their measurement of the speed of sound and the breaking up of water jets. Stymied by the lack of a sight of the water jet provided to the audience, he used a tube to collect and pipe sunlight to the lecture table. The light was trapped by the total internal reflection of the tube until the water jet, upon which edge the light incidented at a glancing angle, broke up and carried the light in a curved flow. Colladon reported this experiment to a wider audience in the Comptes rendus, the French Academy of Sciences' journal, in 1842.

His experiments formed one of the core principles of modern-day optical fiber, alongside those of:

- Auguste Arthur de la Rive — who demonstrated Colladon's experiment using electric arc light
- Jacques Babinet — who, separately, had created the same effect using candlelight and a glass bottle and
- John Tyndall — who, in 1870, demonstrated that light used internal reflection to follow a specific path using a jet of water that flowed from one container to another and a beam of light.

In 1841, he conducted experiments on Lake Geneva demonstrating that sound traveled over four times as fast in water as in air. He was able to transmit sound waves from Nyon to Montreux, a distance of 50 km, and envisioned developing a novel means of transmitting information via underwater sound signals between England and France via the Channel.

Hydrophones used by Colladon (on display at MHS Geneva)
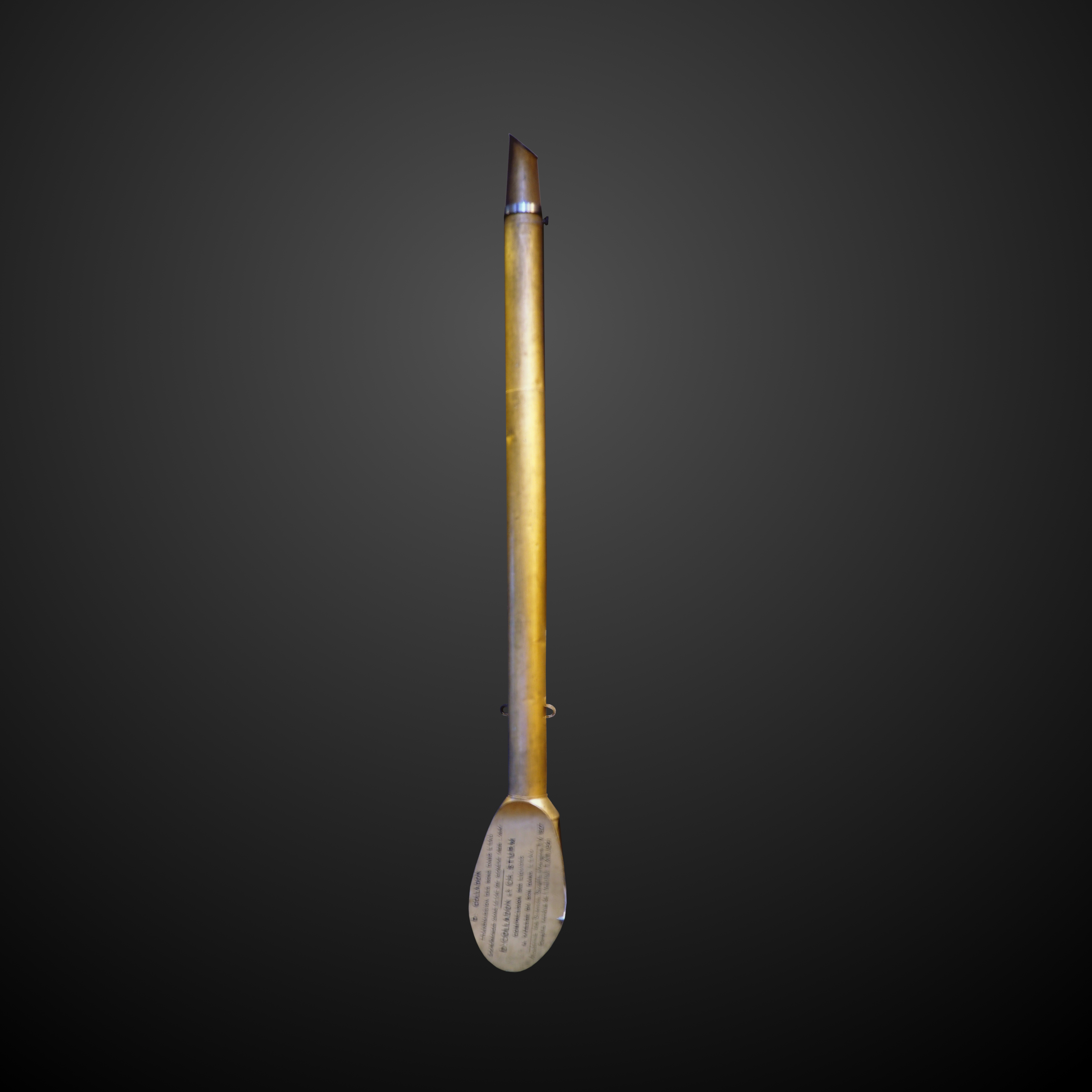
First model used to measure the speed of sound 1826

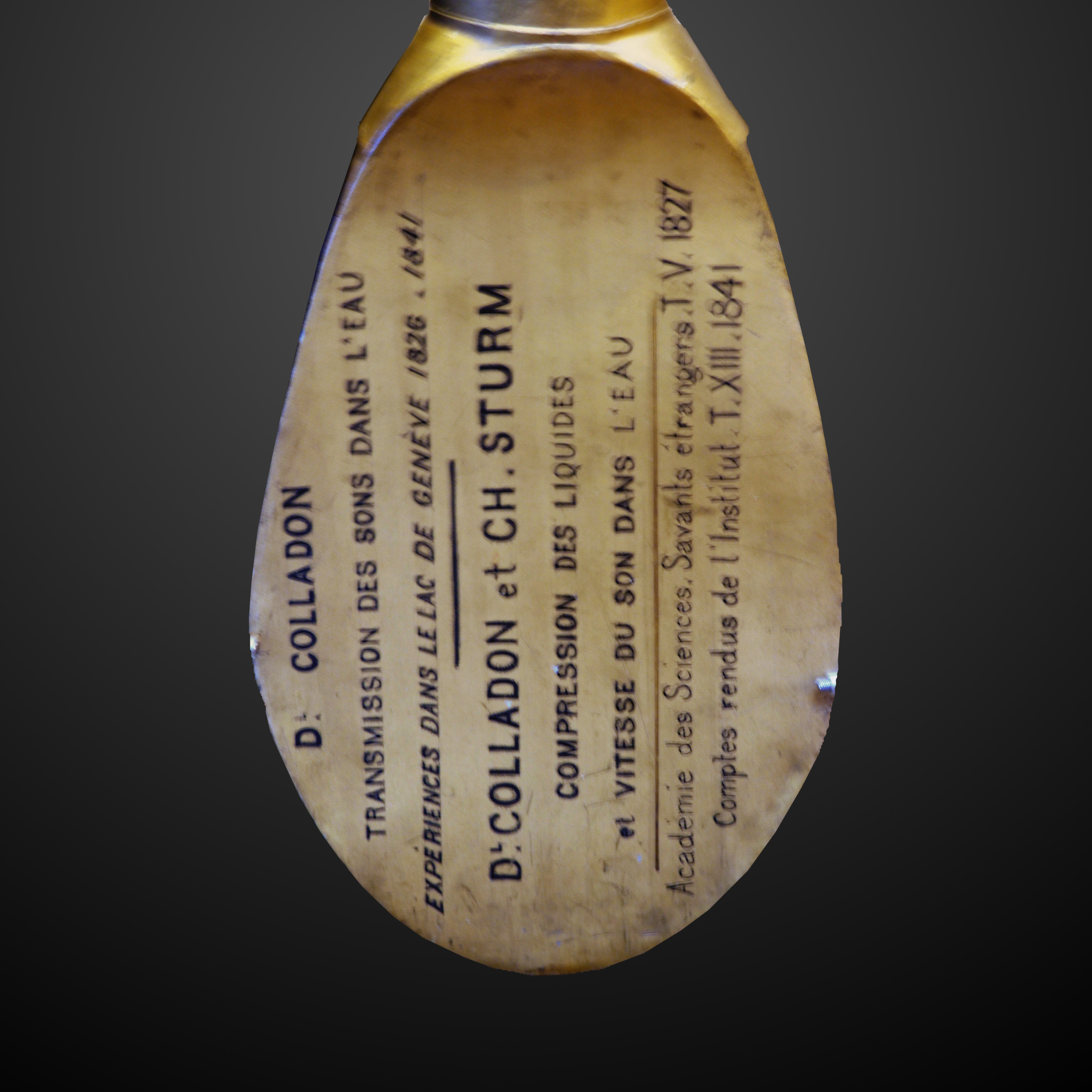
Detail

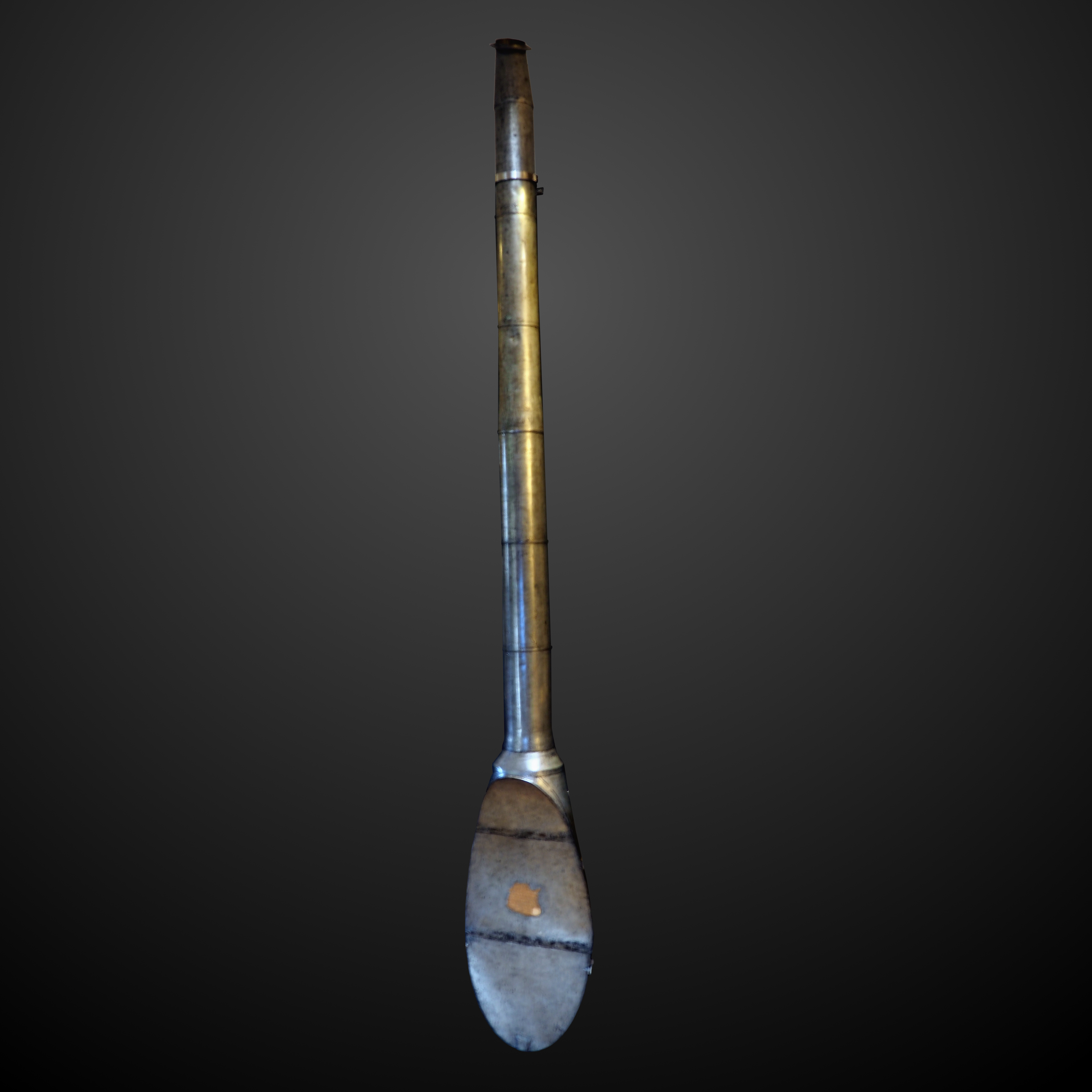
1840 model used in the Nyon — Montreux experiment

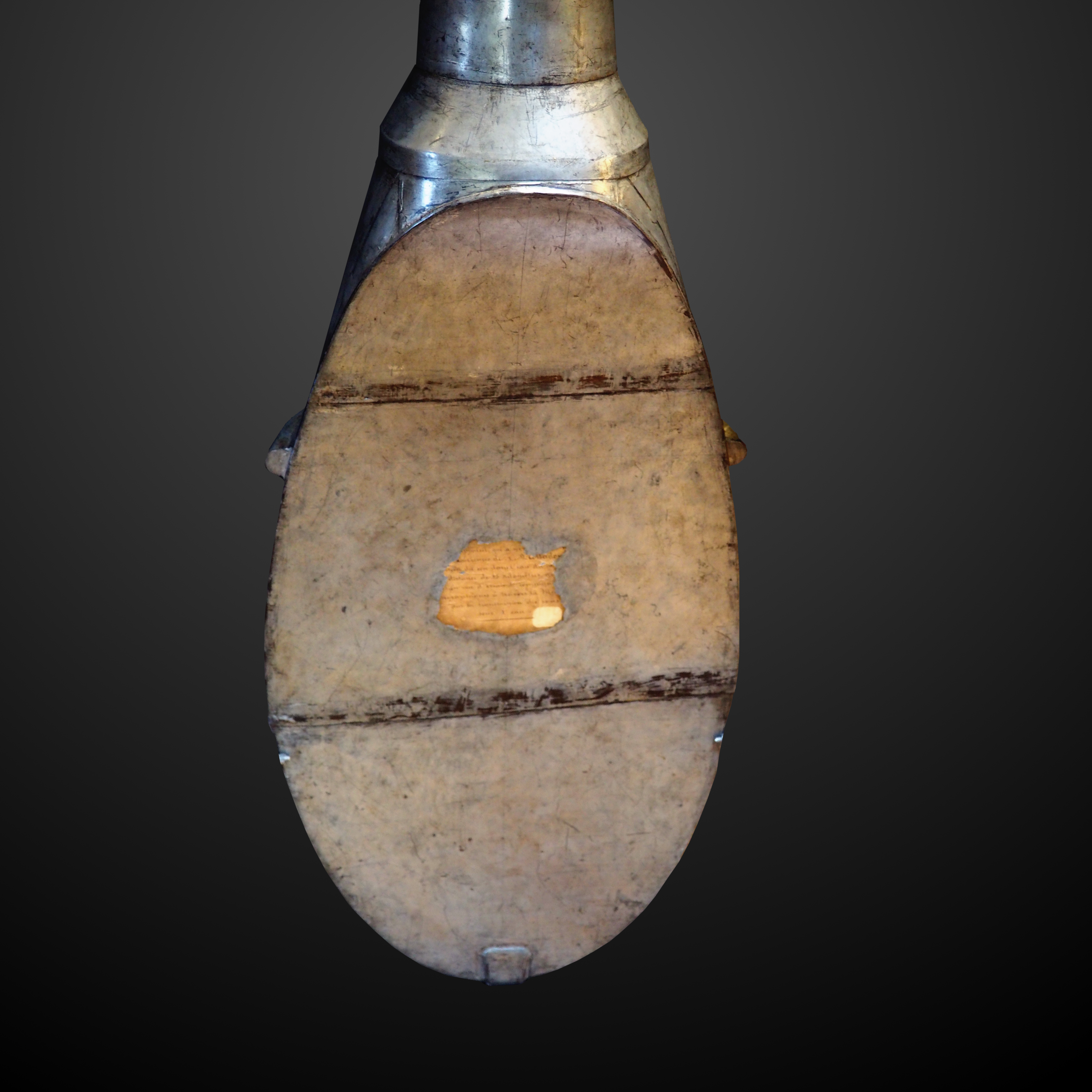
Detail

Colladon won the Grand Prize of the Academy of Sciences in Paris for his research on the compressibility of liquids. He also worked extensively on hydraulics, steam engines, and air compressors. He invented a type of hydraulic generator that could float on water, thereby providing a constant output of energy regardless of water level.

On December 25, 1844, Geneva was first illuminated by a network of gas lights, a project Colladon had been instrumental in advocating and promoting.
