= Alfreds Meders =

German-Latvian mathematician

- Born: September 19, 1873; Riga, Latvia
- Died: June 28, 1944; Poznań, Poland

Alfreds Arnolds Adolfs Meders was a German-Latvian mathematician, and a student of Adolf Kneser at the University of Tartu. He was a professor at the Riga Technical University until his mandatory repatriation to Germany in 1939. In Riga, Eizens Leimanis was one of his students.
