= Kneser's theorem (differential equations) =

Mathematical theorem

In mathematics, the Kneser theorem can refer to two distinct theorems in the field of ordinary differential equations:

- the first one, named after Adolf Kneser, provides criteria to decide whether a differential equation is oscillating or not;
- the other one, named after Hellmuth Kneser, is about the topology of the set of all solutions of an initial value problem with continuous right hand side.

== Statement of the theorem due to A. Kneser ==
Consider an ordinary linear homogeneous differential equation of the form

$$y'' + q(x)y = 0$$

with

$$q: [0,+\infty) \to \mathbb{R}$$

continuous. We say this equation is oscillating if it has a solution y with infinitely many zeros, and non-oscillating otherwise.

The theorem states that the equation is non-oscillating if

$$\limsup_{x \to +\infty} x^2 q(x) < \tfrac{1}{4}$$

and oscillating if

$$\liminf_{x \to +\infty} x^2 q(x) > \tfrac{1}{4}.$$

=== Example ===
To illustrate the theorem consider

$$q(x) = \left(\frac{1}{4} - a\right) x^{-2} \quad\text{for}\quad x > 0$$

where $a$ is real and non-zero. According to the theorem, solutions will be oscillating or not depending on whether $a$ is positive (non-oscillating) or negative (oscillating) because

$$\limsup_{x \to +\infty} x^2 q(x) = \liminf_{x \to +\infty} x^2 q(x) = \frac{1}{4} - a$$

To find the solutions for this choice of $q(x)$, and verify the theorem for this example, substitute the 'Ansatz'

$$y(x) = x^n$$

which gives

$$n(n-1) + \frac{1}{4} - a = \left(n-\frac{1}{2}\right)^2 - a = 0$$

This means that (for non-zero $a$) the general solution is

$$y(x) = A x^{\frac{1}{2} + \sqrt{a}} + B x^{\frac{1}{2} - \sqrt{a}}$$

where $A$ and $B$ are arbitrary constants.

It is not hard to see that for positive $a$ the solutions do not oscillate while for negative $a = -\omega^2$ the identity

$$x^{\frac{1}{2} \pm i \omega} = \sqrt{x}\ e^{\pm (i\omega) \ln{x}} = \sqrt{x}\ (\cos{(\omega \ln x)} \pm i \sin{(\omega \ln x)})$$

shows that they do.

The general result follows from this example by the Sturm–Picone comparison theorem.

=== Extensions ===
There are many extensions to this result, such as the Gesztesy–Ünal criterion.

== Statement of the theorem due to H. Kneser ==
While Peano's existence theorem guarantees the existence of solutions of certain initial values problems with continuous right hand side, H. Kneser's theorem deals with the topology of the set of those solutions. Precisely, H. Kneser's theorem states the following:

Let $f\colon \R\times \R^n \rightarrow \R^n$ be a continuous function on the region $\mathcal{R}:=[t_0, t_0+a] \times \{x \in \mathbb{R}^n: \Vert x-x_0\Vert \le b\}$, and such that $|f(t, x)| \le M$ for all $(t,x) \in \mathcal{R}$.

Given a real number $c$ satisfying $t_0<c \le t_0+\min(a, b/M)$, define the set $S_c$ as the set of points $x_c$ for which there is a solution $x = x(t)$ of $\dot{x} = f(t, x)$ such that $x(t_0)=x_0$ and $x(c) = x_c$. Then $S_c$ is a closed and connected set.
