= Steinhaus chessboard theorem =

Mathematical theorem

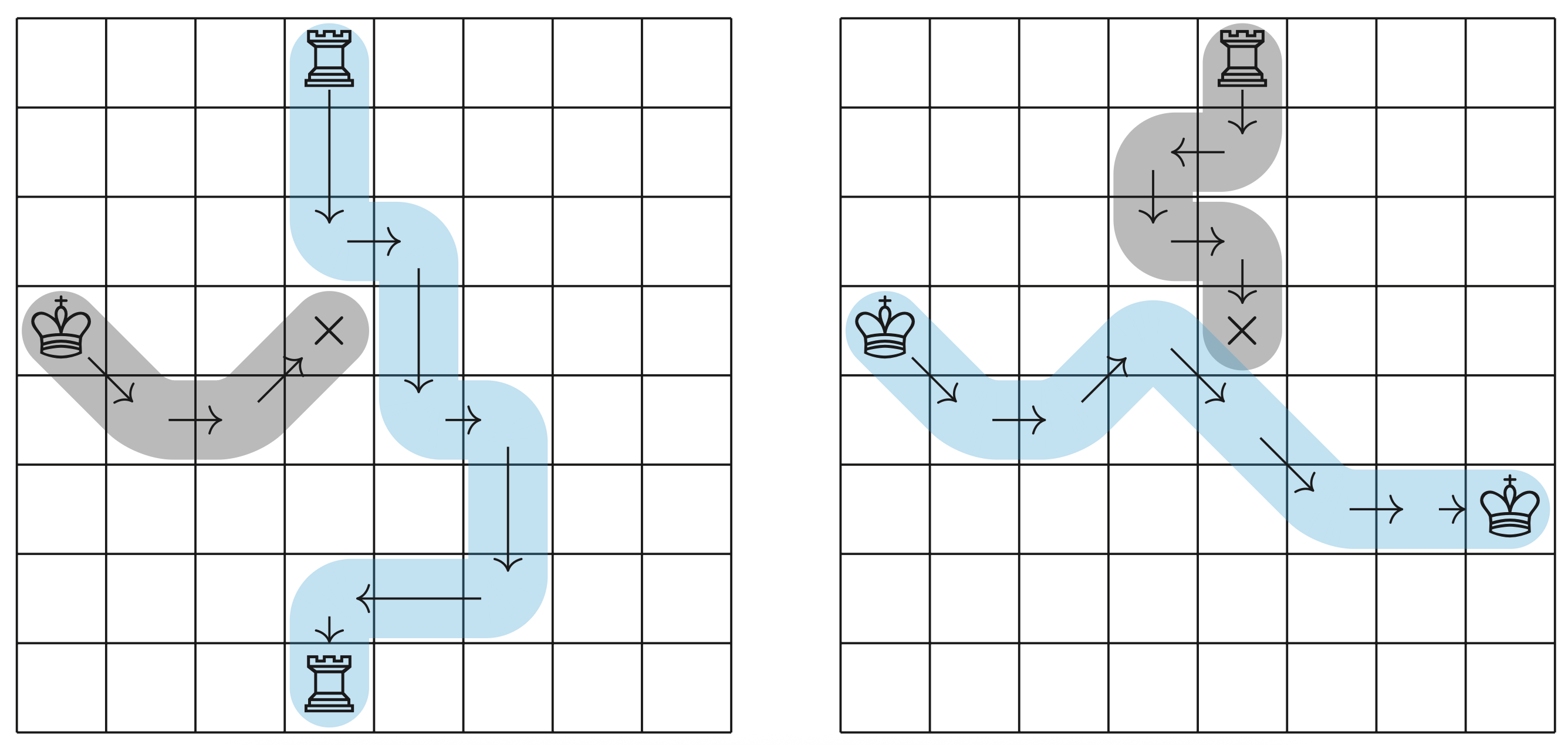
The Steinhaus Chessboard Theorem states that a rook's path from top to bottom of a chessboard will block any king's path from left to right, and a king's path from left to right will block any rook's path from top to bottom.

In combinatorial topology, the Steinhaus chessboard theorem is the following theorem, due to Hugo Steinhaus:

Consider a chessboard on which some cells contain landmines. Then, either the king can cross the board from left to right without meeting a mined square, or the rook can cross the board from top to bottom moving only on mined squares.

== Two-dimensional variants ==
David Gale proved a variant of the theorem in which the tiles on the chessboard are hexagons, as in the game of Hex. In this variant, there is no difference between king moves and rook moves.

Kulpa, Socha and Turzanski prove a generalized variant of the chessboard theorem, in which the board can be partitioned into arbitrary polygons, rather than just squares. They also give an algorithm for finding either a king route or a rook route.

== n-dimensional variants ==
Tkacz and Turzanski generalize the chessboard theorem to an n-dimensional board:

Consider a grid of n-dimensional cubes. Color each cube with one of n colors 1,...,n. Then, there exists a set of cubes all colored i, which connect the opposite grid sides in dimension i.

Ahlbach present the proof of Tkacz and Turzanski to the n-dimensional chessboard theorem, and use it to prove the Poincaré-Miranda theorem. The intuitive idea is as follows. Suppose by contradiction that an n-dimensional function f, satisfying the conditions to Miranda's theorem does not have a zero. In other words, for each point x, there is at least one coordinate i for which f_{i}(x) is nonzero. Let us color each point x with some color i for which f_{i}(x) is nonzero. By the Steinhaus chessboard theorem, there exists some i for which there is a path of points colored i connecting the two opposite sides on dimension i. By the Poincaré-Miranda conditions, f_{i}(x)<0 at the start of the path and f_{i}(x)>0 at the end of the path, and the function is continuous along the path. Therefore, there must be a point on the path on which f_{i}(x)=0 - a contradiction.

== See also ==
- A different theorem of Steinhaus, related to arranging rooks on a chessboard, that can be proved using Hall's marriage theorem.
