= Atkinson's theorem =

In operator theory, Atkinson's theorem (named for Frederick Valentine Atkinson) gives a characterization of Fredholm operators.

== The theorem ==
Let H be a Hilbert space and L(H) the set of bounded operators on H. The following is the classical definition of a Fredholm operator: an operator T ∈ L(H) is said to be a Fredholm operator if the kernel Ker(T) is finite-dimensional, Ker(T*) is finite-dimensional (where T* denotes the adjoint of T), and the range Ran(T) is closed.

Atkinson's theorem states:

A T ∈ L(H) is a Fredholm operator if and only if T is invertible modulo compact perturbation, i.e. TS = I + C_{1} and ST = I + C_{2} for some bounded operator S and compact operators C_{1} and C_{2}.

In other words, an operator T ∈ L(H) is Fredholm, in the classical sense, if and only if its projection in the Calkin algebra is invertible.

=== Sketch of proof ===
The outline of a proof is as follows. For the ⇒ implication, express H as the orthogonal direct sum

$$H =
\operatorname{Ker}(T)^\perp \oplus \operatorname{Ker} (T).$$

The restriction T : Ker(T)^{⊥} → Ran(T) is a bijection, and therefore invertible by the open mapping theorem. Extend this inverse by 0 on Ran(T)^{⊥} = Ker(T*) to an operator S defined on all of H. Then I − TS is the finite-rank projection onto Ker(T*), and I − ST is the projection onto Ker(T). This proves the only if part of the theorem.

For the converse, suppose now that ST = I + C_{2} for some compact operator C_{2}. If x ∈ Ker(T), then STx = x + C_{2}x = 0. So Ker(T) is contained in an eigenspace of C_{2}, which is finite-dimensional (see spectral theory of compact operators). Therefore, Ker(T) is also finite-dimensional. The same argument shows that Ker(T*) is also finite-dimensional.

To prove that Ran(T) is closed, we make use of the approximation property: let F be a finite-rank operator such that ||F − C_{2}|| < r. Then for every x in Ker(F),

||S||⋅||Tx|| ≥ ||STx|| = ||x + C_{2}x|| = ||x + Fx +C_{2}x − Fx|| ≥ ||x|| − ||C_{2} − F||⋅||x|| ≥ (1 − r)||x||.

Thus T is bounded below on Ker(F), which implies that T(Ker(F)) is closed. On the other hand, T(Ker(F)^{⊥}) is finite-dimensional, since Ker(F)^{⊥} = Ran(F*) is finite-dimensional. Therefore, Ran(T) = T(Ker(F)) + T(Ker(F)^{⊥}) is closed, and this proves the theorem.

A more complete treatment of Atkinson's Theorem is in the reference by Arveson: it shows that if B is a Banach space, an operator is Fredholm if and only if it is invertible modulo a finite rank operator (and that the latter is equivalent to being invertible modulo a compact operator, which is significant in view of Enflo's example of a separable, reflexive Banach space with compact operators that are not norm-limits of finite rank operators). For Banach spaces, a Fredholm operator is one with finite dimensional kernel and range of finite codimension (equivalent to the kernel of its adjoint being finite dimensional). Note that the hypothesis that Ran(T) is closed is redundant since a space of finite codimension that is also the range of a bounded operator is always closed (see Arveson reference below); this is a consequence of the open-mapping theorem (and is not true if the space is not the range of a bounded operator, for example the kernel of a discontinuous linear functional).
