= Poincaré–Miranda theorem =

Generalisation of the intermediate value theorem

In mathematics, the Poincaré–Miranda theorem is a generalization of intermediate value theorem, from a single function in a single dimension, to n functions in n dimensions. It says as follows:

Consider $n$ continuous, real-valued functions of $n$ variables, $f_1,\ldots, f_n\colon [-1,1]^n\to \R$. Assume that for each variable $x_i$, the function $f_i$ is nonpositive when $x_i=-1$ and nonnegative when $x_i=1$. Then there is a point in the $n$-dimensional cube $[-1,1]^n$ in which all functions are simultaneously equal to $0$.

The theorem is named after Henri Poincaré — who conjectured it in 1883 — and Carlo Miranda — who in 1940 showed that it is equivalent to the Brouwer fixed-point theorem. It is sometimes called the Miranda theorem or the Bolzano–Poincaré–Miranda theorem.

== Intuitive description ==
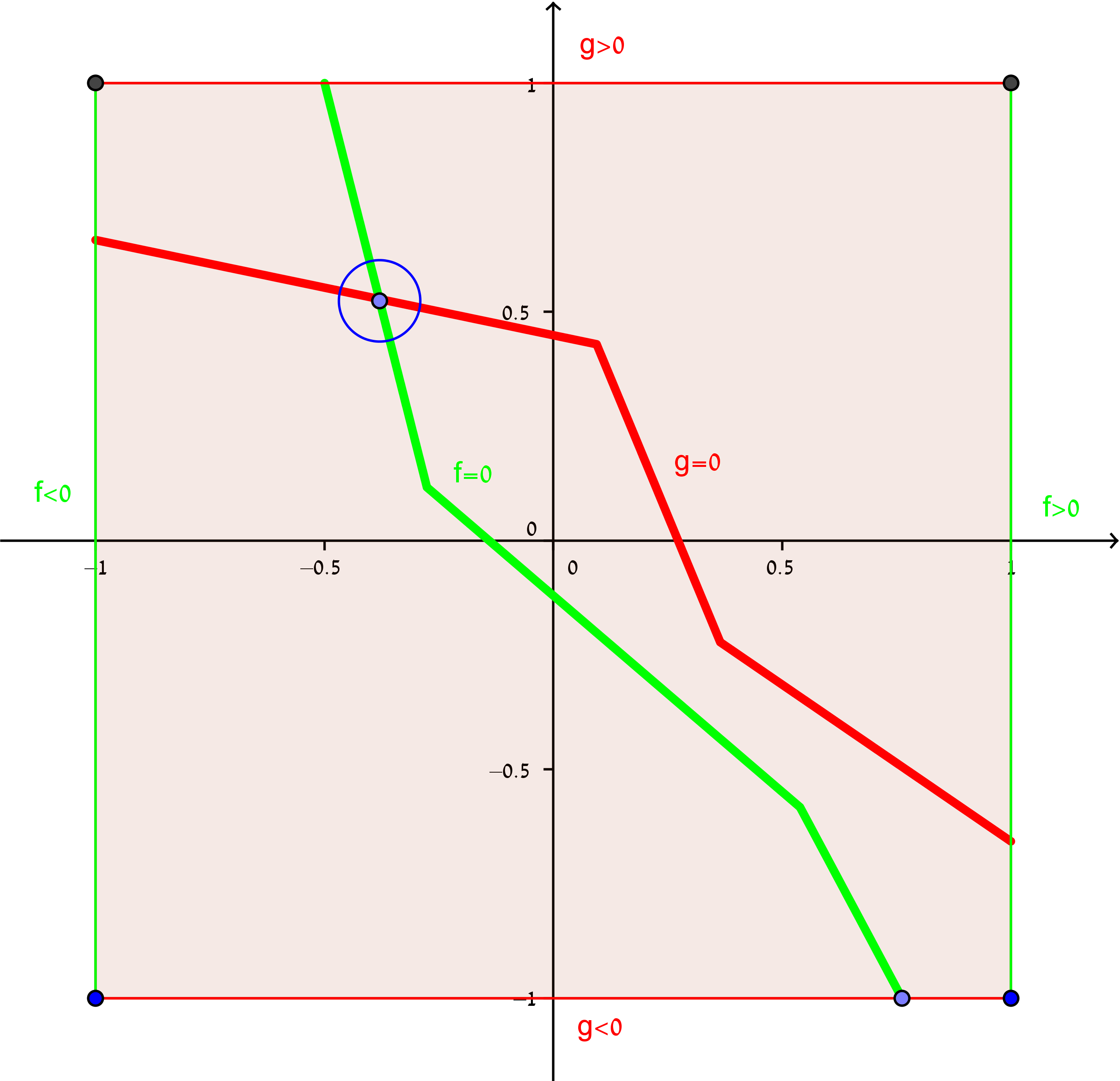
A graphical representation of Poincaré–Miranda theorem for n = 2

The picture on the right shows an illustration of the Poincaré–Miranda theorem for n = 2 functions. Consider a couple of functions (f,g) whose domain of definition is [-1,1]^{2} (i.e., the unit square). The function f is negative on the left boundary and positive on the right boundary (green sides of the square), while the function g is negative on the lower boundary and positive on the upper boundary (red sides of the square). When we go from left to right along any path, we must go through a point in which f is 0. Therefore, there must be a "wall" separating the left from the right, along which f is 0 (green curve inside the square). Similarly, there must be a "wall" separating the top from the bottom, along which g is 0 (red curve inside the square). These walls must intersect in a point in which both functions are 0 (blue point inside the square).

== Generalizations ==
The simplest generalization, as a matter of fact a corollary, of this theorem is the following one. For every variable x_{i}, let a_{i} be any value in the range [sup_{x_{i} = 0} f_{i}, inf_{x_{i} = 1} f_{i}]. Then there is a point in the unit cube in which for all i:

$$f_i=a_i$$.

This statement can be reduced to the original one by a simple translation of axes,

$$x^\prime_i=x_i\qquad y^\prime_i=y_i-a_i\qquad \forall i\in\{1,\dots,n\}$$

where

- x_{i} are the coordinates in the domain of the function
- y_{i} are the coordinates in the codomain of the function.

By using topological degree theory it is possible to prove yet another generalization. Poincare-Miranda was also generalized to infinite-dimensional spaces.

== See also ==
- The Steinhaus chessboard theorem is a discrete theorem that can be used to prove the Poincare-Miranda theorem.
