= Rudolf Weyrich =

German mathematician, physicist, and inventor

Rudolf Weyrich (1894 – 1971) was a German mathematician, physicist, and inventor.

== Biography ==
Weyrich studied at the University of Rostock and at the University of Breslau, where he received in 1922 his Promotion (Ph.D.) under Adolf Kneser. From 1923 to 1925 Weyrich was a Privatdocent at the University of Marburg. In 1925 he became a professor extraordinarius at the Deutsche Technische Hochschule Brünn. He worked there until 1945 when it was abolished as part of the expulsion of ethnic Germans from Czechoslovakia. From 1948 to 1950 Weyrich was a lecturer at the Braunschweig University of Technology. In 1950 he was appointed a professor ordinarius at Istanbul Technical University, where he taught until his retirement in 1958. In retirement he lived in Braunschweig.

Rudolf Weyrich [...] served in World War I, was wounded at Brzeziny, and had consequently lost the sight in his left eye.

Weyrich was an Invited Speaker of the ICM in 1932 in Zurich.

== Selected publications ==
- Beiträge zur Theorie der Kurven konstanter geodätischer Krümmung auf krummen Flächen Mathematische Zeitschrift 16, no. 1 (1923): 249–272. doi:10.1007/BF01175685
- Zur Theorie der Ausbreitung elektromagnetischer Wellen längs der Erdoberfläche Annalen der Physik 390, no. 5 (1928): 552–580. doi:10.1002/andp.19283900505
- Über das Strahlungsfeld einer endlichen Antenne zwischen zwei vollkommen leitenden Ebenen Annalen der Physik 394, no. 7 (1929): 794–804. doi:10.1002/andp.19293940703
- Bemerkungen zu den Arbeiten „Zur Theorie der Ausbreitung elektromagnetischer Wellen längs der Erdoberfläche” ︁ und „Über das Strahlungsfeld einer endlichen Antenne zwischen zwei vollkommen leitenden Ebenen Annalen der Physik 401, no. 5 (1931): 513–518. doi:10.1002/andp.19314010502
- Über einige Randwertprobleme, insbesondere der Elektrodynamik Journal für die reine und angewandte Mathematik 172 (1935): 133–150.
- Die Zylinderfunktionen und ihre Anwendungen Leipzig: BG Teubner, 1937. v+137 pp. (See also Bessel function.)

== Patents ==
- "Transmitter and receiver for electromagnetic waves." U.S. Patent 2,044,413, issued June 16, 1936.
