= Sturm–Picone comparison theorem =

In mathematics, in the field of ordinary differential equations, the Sturm–Picone comparison theorem, named after Jacques Charles François Sturm and Mauro Picone, is a classical theorem which provides criteria for the oscillation and non-oscillation of solutions of certain linear differential equations in the real domain.

Let p_{i}, q_{i} for i = 1, 2 be real-valued continuous functions on the interval [a, b] and let

1. $(p_1(x) y^\prime)^\prime + q_1(x) y = 0$
2. $(p_2(x) y^\prime)^\prime + q_2(x) y = 0$

be two homogeneous linear second order differential equations in self-adjoint form with

$$0 < p_2(x) \le p_1(x)$$

and

$$q_1(x) \le q_2(x).$$

Let u be a non-trivial solution of (1) with successive roots at z_{1} and z_{2} and let v be a non-trivial solution of (2). Then one of the following properties holds.

- There exists an x in (z_{1}, z_{2}) such that v(x) = 0; or
- there exists a λ in R such that v(x) = λ u(x).

The first part of the conclusion is due to Sturm (1836), while the second (alternative) part of the theorem is due to Picone (1910) whose simple proof was given using his now famous Picone identity. In the special case where both equations are identical one obtains the Sturm separation theorem.
