= Atkinson–Mingarelli theorem =

On eigenvalues of Sturm–Liouville operators

In applied mathematics, the Atkinson–Mingarelli theorem, named after Frederick Valentine Atkinson and A. B. Mingarelli, concerns eigenvalues of certain Sturm–Liouville differential operators.

In the simplest of formulations let p, q, w be real-valued piecewise continuous functions defined on a closed bounded real interval, I = [a, b]. The function w(x), which is sometimes denoted by r(x), is called the "weight" or "density" function. Consider the Sturm–Liouville differential equation

$-\frac{d}{dx}\left[p(x)\frac{dy}{ dx}\right]+q(x)y=\lambda w(x)y,$	1

where y is a function of the independent variable x. In this case, y is called a solution if it is continuously differentiable on (a,b) and (p y′)(x) is piecewise continuously differentiable and y satisfies the equation (1) at all except a finite number of points in (a,b). The unknown function y is typically required to satisfy some boundary conditions at a and b.

The boundary conditions under consideration here are usually called separated boundary conditions and they are of the form:

$\alpha_{1}y(a)+\alpha_{2}y'(a)=0\qquad(\alpha_1^2+\alpha_2^2>0),$	2

$\beta_{1}y(b)+\beta_{2}y'(b)=0\qquad(\beta_1^2+\beta_2^2>0),$	3

where the $\{\alpha_i, \beta_i\}$, i = 1, 2 are real numbers. We define

== The theorem ==
Assume that p(x) has a finite number of sign changes and that the positive (resp. negative) part of the function p(x)/w(x) defined by $(w/p)_{+}(x) = \max \{w(x)/p(x), 0\}$, (resp. $(w/p)_{-}(x) = \max \{ -w(x)/p(x), 0\})$ are not identically zero functions over I. Then the eigenvalue problem (1), (2)–(3) has an infinite number of real positive eigenvalues ${\lambda_i}^{+}$,
$$0 < {\lambda_1}^{+} < {\lambda_2}^{+} < {\lambda_3}^{+} < \cdots < {\lambda_n}^{+} < \cdots \to \infty;$$
and an infinite number of negative eigenvalues ${\lambda_i}^{-}$,
$$0 > {\lambda_1}^{-} > {\lambda_2}^{-} > {\lambda_3}^{-} > \cdots > {\lambda_n}^{-} > \cdots \to - \infty;$$
whose spectral asymptotics are given by their solution [2] of Jörgens' Conjecture [3]:
$${\lambda_n}^{+} \sim \frac{n^2 \pi^2}{\left(\int_a^b \sqrt{(w/p)_{+}(x)}\, dx\right)^2},\quad n \to \infty,$$
and
$${\lambda_n}^{-} \sim \frac{- n^2 \pi^2}{\left(\int_a^b \sqrt{(w/p)_{-}(x)}\, dx\right)^2},\quad n \to \infty.$$

For more information on the general theory behind (1) see the article on Sturm–Liouville theory. The stated theorem is actually valid more generally for coefficient functions $1/p,\, q,\, w$ that are Lebesgue integrable over I.
