= Eizens Leimanis =

Latvian mathematician

Eižens Leimanis
- Eižens Leimanis
- Born: April 10, 1905; Koceni parish
- Died: December 4, 1992 (aged 87)
- Other name: Eugene
- Occupations: Assistant Professor, Professor
- Spouse: Zigrida Gipslis

Academic background
- Education: University of Latvia

Academic work
- Discipline: Mathematics
- Institutions: University Of Latvia, University Of British Columbia

Eižens Leimanis (April 10, 1905 – December 4, 1992) was a Latvian mathematician who worked on the three-body problem. He taught for many years at the University of British Columbia in Canada.

== Personal information ==
Leimanis was born in Koceni parish, Valmiera county, Vidzeme province, Russian empire now Kocēni Parish in Latvia. Leimanis and his family went to exile in Germany at the end World War II. For more than half a century he lived in Germany and Canada, and as a professor of mathematics he also worked at the British Columbia University in Vancouver, British Columbia, Canada. He lived until the age of 87 and was survived by his wife, six children, five grandchildren, and one great-grandchild.

== Career and education ==
Leimanis received a master's degree and First Prize in Mathematics at the University of Latvia, where his professors included Alfreds Meders. He worked as an assistant professor at the University of Latvia where he delivered lectures in the courses such as theoretical mechanics, orbital theory, celestial mechanics, practical analysis and descriptive geometry. He also taught at the University of British Columbia from 1949 until 1974.

Leimanis's life and study centered around the three-body problem but he also had many publications related to the history of mathematics, philosophy, and religion.

== Publications ==
- The General Problem of the Motion of Coupled Rigid Bodies about a Fixed Point. New York: Springer (1965)
