= Tait–Kneser theorem =

Theorem in differential geometry

The nested osculating circles of an Archimedean spiral. The spiral itself is not shown, but is visible where the circles are more dense.

In differential geometry, the Tait–Kneser theorem states that, if a smooth plane curve has monotonic curvature, then the osculating circles of the curve are disjoint and nested within each other. The logarithmic spiral or the pictured Archimedean spiral provide examples of curves whose curvature is monotonic for the entire curve. This monotonicity cannot happen for a simple closed curve (by the four-vertex theorem, there are at least four vertices where the curvature reaches an extreme point) but for such curves the theorem can be applied to the arcs of the curves between its vertices.

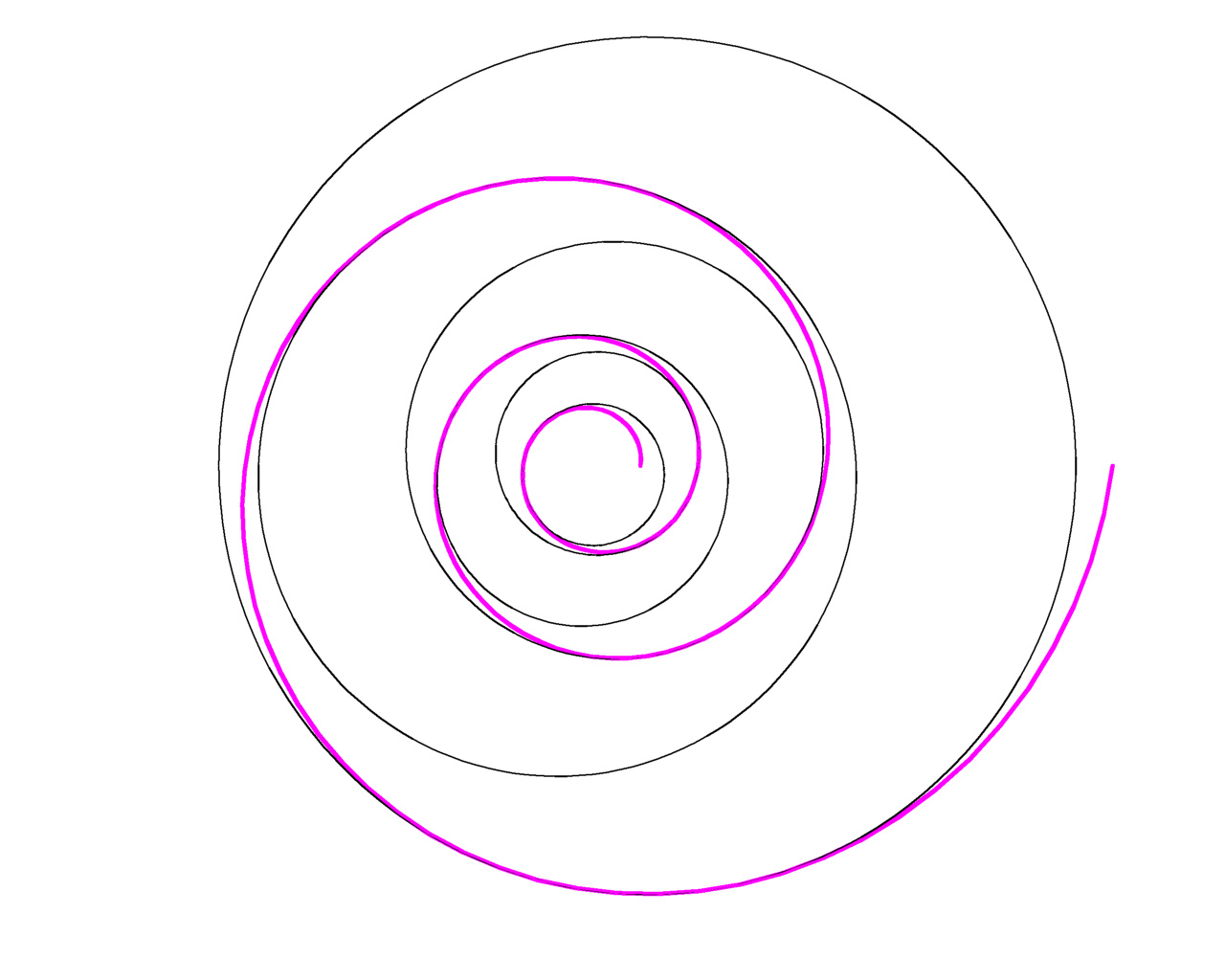
A logarithmic spiral with some osculating circles. These do not intersect, hence satisfying the Tait–Kneser theorem.

The theorem is named after Peter Tait, who published it in 1896, and Adolf Kneser, who rediscovered it and published it in 1912. Tait's proof follows simply from the properties of the evolute, the curve traced out by the centers of osculating circles. For curves with monotone curvature, the arc length along the evolute between two centers equals the difference in radii of the corresponding circles. This arc length must be greater than the straight-line distance between the same two centers, so the two circles have centers closer together than the difference of their radii, from which the theorem follows.

Analogous disjointness theorems can be proved for the family of Taylor polynomials of a given smooth function, and for the osculating conics to a given smooth curve.
