= Istituto per le Applicazioni del Calcolo Mauro Picone =

Italian research institute

Istituto per le Applicazioni del Calcolo "Mauro Picone"
- Founder: Mauro Picone
- Established: 1927
- Formerly called: Istituto di Calcolo per l'Analisi Numerica (1927–1932); Istituto Nazionale per le Applicazioni del Calcolo (INAC) (1932–1975)
- Address: Via dei Taurini 19, 00185 Roma
- Location: Italy
- Website: http://www.iac.rm.cnr.it

The Istituto per le Applicazioni del Calcolo Mauro Picone (English: Institute for applied mathematics "Mauro Picone"), abbreviated IAC, is an applied mathematics institute, part of the Consiglio Nazionale delle Ricerche. It was founded in 1927 as a private research institute by Mauro Picone, and as such it is considered the first applied and computational mathematics institute of such kind ever founded.

== Historical notes ==
The IAC was founded 1927 by Mauro Picone, while working at the University of Naples Federico II and at the Istituto Universitario Navale as professor of infinitesimal calculus. Luigi Amoroso also contributed to the founding of the institute, by providing to his former Normale schoolfellow Picone the funding for the creation of the Institute by means of the Banco di Napoli. It was only in 1932, when Picone moved from the University of Naples to the Sapienza University of Rome, that the Institute became part of the Italian National Research Council.

== See also ==
- Istituto Nazionale di Alta Matematica Francesco Severi
