= Ergebnisse der Mathematik und ihrer Grenzgebiete =

Ergebnisse der Mathematik und ihrer Grenzgebiete/A Series of Modern Surveys in Mathematics is a series of scholarly monographs published by Springer Science+Business Media. The title literally means "Results in mathematics and related areas". Most of the books were published in German or English, but there were a few in French and Italian. There have been several sequences, or Folge: the original series, neue Folge, and 3.Folge.

== Original series ==
The series started in 1932 with publication of Knotentheorie by Kurt Reidemeister as "Band 1" (English: volume 1). There seems to have been double numeration in this sequence.

== Neue Folge ==
This sequence started in 1950 with the publication of Transfinite Zahlen by Heinz Bachmann. The volumes are consecutively numbered, designated as either "Band" or "Heft". A total of 100 volumes was published, often in multiple editions, but preserving the original numbering within the series.

The ISSN for this sequence is 0071-1136. In February 2008, P. R. Halmos, P. J. Hilton, R. Remmert, and B. Szökefalvi-Nagy were listed on the series' website as the editors of the defunct 2. Folge.

== 3. Folge ==
This sequence started in 1983 with the publication of Galois module structure of algebraic integers by Albrecht Fröhlich.

In February 2008, the editor-in-chief was R. Remmert. In early 2025, Remi Lodh held this post.
