= Oscillation theory =

In mathematics, in the field of ordinary differential equations, a nontrivial solution to an ordinary differential equation

$$F(x,y,y',\ \dots,\ y^{(n-1)})=y^{(n)} \quad x \in [0,+\infty)$$

is called oscillating if it has an infinite number of roots; otherwise it is called non-oscillating. The differential equation is called oscillating if it has an oscillating solution. The number of roots carries also information on the spectrum of associated boundary value problems.

== Examples ==
The differential equation

$$y'' + y = 0$$

is oscillating as sin(x) is a solution.

== Connection with spectral theory ==
Oscillation theory was initiated by Jacques Charles François Sturm in his investigations of Sturm–Liouville problems from 1836. There he showed that the n'th eigenfunction of a Sturm–Liouville problem has precisely n-1 roots. For the one-dimensional Schrödinger equation the question about oscillation/non-oscillation answers the question whether the eigenvalues accumulate at the bottom of the continuous spectrum.

== Relative oscillation theory ==
In 1996 Gesztesy–Simon–Teschl showed that the number of roots of the Wronski determinant of two eigenfunctions of a Sturm–Liouville problem gives the number of eigenvalues between the corresponding eigenvalues. It was later on generalized by Krüger–Teschl to the case of two eigenfunctions of two different Sturm–Liouville problems. The investigation of the number of roots of the Wronski determinant of two solutions is known as relative oscillation theory.

== See also ==
Classical results in oscillation theory are:

- Kneser's theorem (differential equations)
- Sturm–Picone comparison theorem
- Sturm separation theorem
