= Sturm separation theorem =

Mathematical theorem

The zeros of two linearly independent solutions of the Airy equation $y'' - xy = 0$ alternate, as predicted by the Sturm separation theorem.

In mathematics, in the field of ordinary differential equations, Sturm separation theorem, named after Jacques Charles François Sturm, describes the location of roots of solutions of homogeneous second order linear differential equations, that is, equations of the form $y'' + p(x)y' + q(x)y = 0$, where $x, y$ are real variables, and $p(x), q(x)$ are functions of $x$.

Basically the theorem states that given two linear independent solutions of such an equation the zeros of the two solutions are alternating.

== Sturm separation theorem ==
If u(x) and v(x) are two non-trivial continuous linearly independent solutions to a homogeneous second order linear differential equation with x_{0} and x_{1} being successive roots of u(x), then v(x) has exactly one root in the open interval (x_{0}, x_{1}). It is a special case of the Sturm-Picone comparison theorem.

== Proof ==
Since $\displaystyle u$ and $\displaystyle v$ are linearly independent it follows that the Wronskian $\displaystyle W[u,v]$ must satisfy $W[u,v](x)\equiv W(x)\neq 0$ for all $\displaystyle x$ where the differential equation is defined, say $\displaystyle I$. Without loss of generality, suppose that $W(x)<0\mbox{ }\forall\mbox{ }x\in I$. Then
$$u(x)v'(x)-u'(x)v(x)\neq 0.$$
So at $\displaystyle x=x_0$
$$W(x_0)=-u'\left(x_0\right)v\left(x_0\right)$$
and either $u'\left(x_0\right)$ and $v\left(x_0\right)$ are both positive or both negative. Without loss of generality, suppose that they are both positive. Now, at $\displaystyle x=x_1$
$$W(x_1)=-u'\left(x_1\right)v\left(x_1\right)$$
and since $\displaystyle x=x_0$ and $\displaystyle x=x_1$ are successive zeros of $\displaystyle u(x)$ it causes $u'\left(x_1\right)<0$. Thus, to keep $\displaystyle W(x)<0$ we must have $v\left(x_1\right)<0$. We see this by observing that if $\displaystyle u'(x)>0\mbox{ }\forall\mbox{ }x\in \left(x_0,x_1\right]$ then $\displaystyle u(x)$ would be increasing (away from the $\displaystyle x$-axis), which would never lead to a zero at $\displaystyle x=x_1$. So for a zero to occur at $\displaystyle x=x_1$ at most $u'\left(x_1\right)=0$ (i.e., $u'\left(x_1\right)\leq 0$ and it turns out, by our result from the Wronskian that $u'\left(x_1\right)\leq 0$). So somewhere in the interval $\left(x_0,x_1\right)$ the sign of $\displaystyle v(x)$ changed. By the Intermediate Value Theorem there exists $x^*\in\left(x_0,x_1\right)$ such that $v\left(x^*\right)=0$.

On the other hand, there can be only one zero in $\left(x_0,x_1\right)$, because otherwise $v$ would have two zeros and there would be no zeros of $u$ in between, and it was just proved that this is impossible.
