= Catenary arch =

Architectural pointed arch that follows an inverted catenary curve

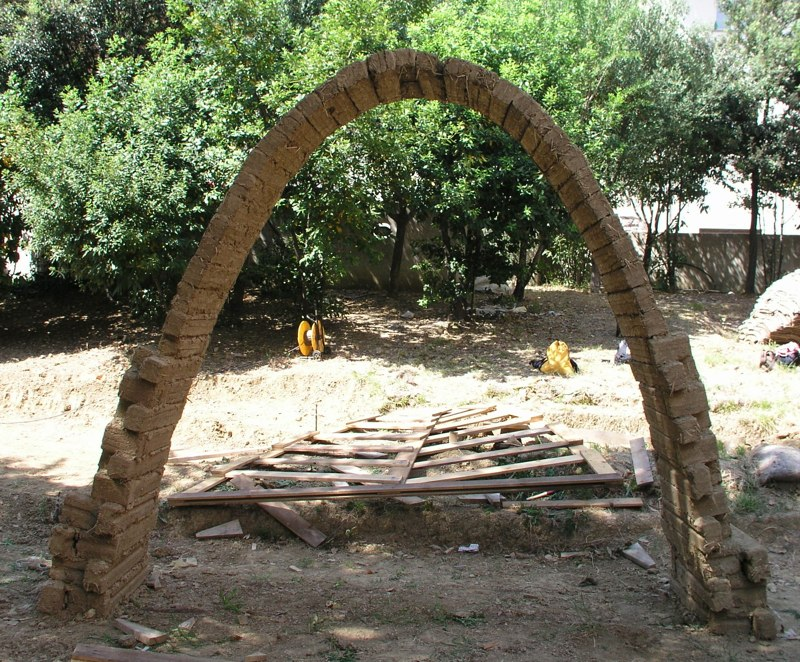
A mudbrick catenary arch

A catenary curve (left) and a catenary arch, also a catenary curve (right). One points up, and one points down, but the curves are the same.

A catenary arch is a type of architectural arch that follows an inverted catenary curve. The catenary curve has been employed in buildings since ancient times. It is not a parabolic arch, although the non-circumferential curves used in arch designs (parabola, catenary, and weighted catenary) look similar, and match at shallow profiles, so a catenary is often misclassified as a parabola (per Galileo, "the [hanging] chain fits its parabola almost perfectly").

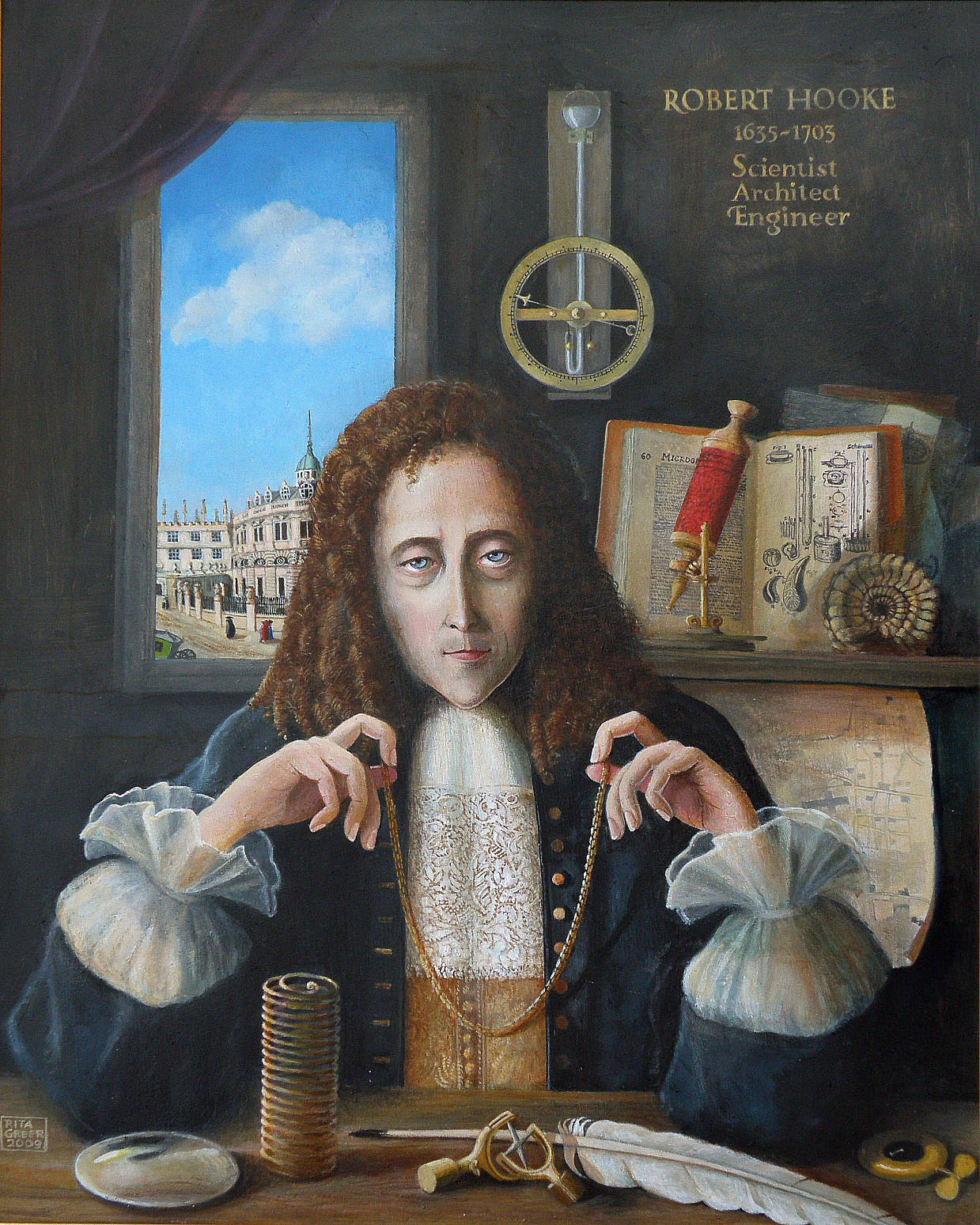
Robert Hooke, holding a hanging chain, which forms a catenary curve

== In history ==
The 17th-century scientist Robert Hooke wrote: "Ut pendet continuum flexile, sic stabit contiguum rigidum inversum", or, "As hangs a flexible cable so, inverted, stand the touching pieces of an arch."

A note written by Thomas Jefferson in 1788 reads, "I have lately received from Italy a treatise on the equilibrium of arches, by the Abbé Mascheroni. It appears to be a very scientific work. I have not yet had time to engage in it; but I find that the conclusions of his demonstrations are, that every part of the catenary is in perfect equilibrium".

== Structural properties ==
Architecturally, a catenary arch has the ability to withstand the weight of the material from which it is constructed, without collapsing. For an arch of uniform density and thickness, supporting only its own weight, the catenary is the ideal curve.

Catenary arches are strong because they redirect the vertical force of gravity into compression forces pressing along the arch's curve. In a uniformly loaded catenary arch, the line of thrust runs through its center.

This principle has been employed architecturally to create arched structures that follow exactly, and in a visibly apparent way, the form of an inverted catenary. A significant early example of this is the arch of Taq Kasra. The catenary, spun 180 degrees, forms the structure of simple domed building such as the beehive homes of the Dingle Peninsula, Ireland.

The principle of the catenary is also the underlying factor in the much more complex architectural systems of the Medieval and Renaissance architecture. Buildings that have heavy roofs that are arched in shape and deliver a strong outward thrust must comply with the form of the catenary curve in order not to collapse. This does not imply that the arches themselves are catenary in form, but that the total system of walls or buttresses that support the roof or dome contain a catenary curve, which delivers the downward thrust.

In the 15th century Brunelleschi designed the pointed, octagonal, Gothic dome on Florence Cathedral in a manner that utilised the principle of the catenary arch. In the 17th century, Christopher Wren designed the dome of St Paul's Cathedral based directly on a catenary curve. The vaulted roof and buttresses of Kings College Chapel, Cambridge, have been discovered to comply with the formula of the catenary arch.

Landscape Arch, Utah

== Examples ==
The classification of non-circumferential curves in actual arches is hard. González et al. provide an example of (well-studied) Palau Güell, where researchers do not agree on classification of the arches or claim the prominence of parabolic arches, while the accurate measurements show that just two of the 23 arches designed by Gaudi are actually parabolic.

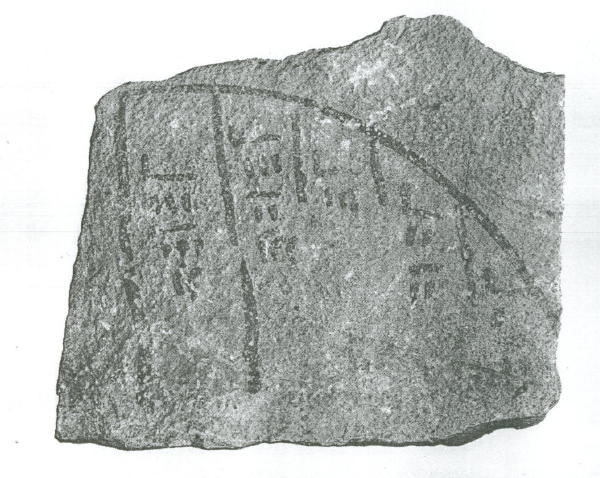
Saqqara ostracon

=== Natural arches ===
- Rainbow Natural Bridge in the U.S. state of Utah has a natural catenary shape, possibly produced by weathering in high-stress areas. Kolob Arch and Landscape Arch, also in Utah, have a catenary shape as well.

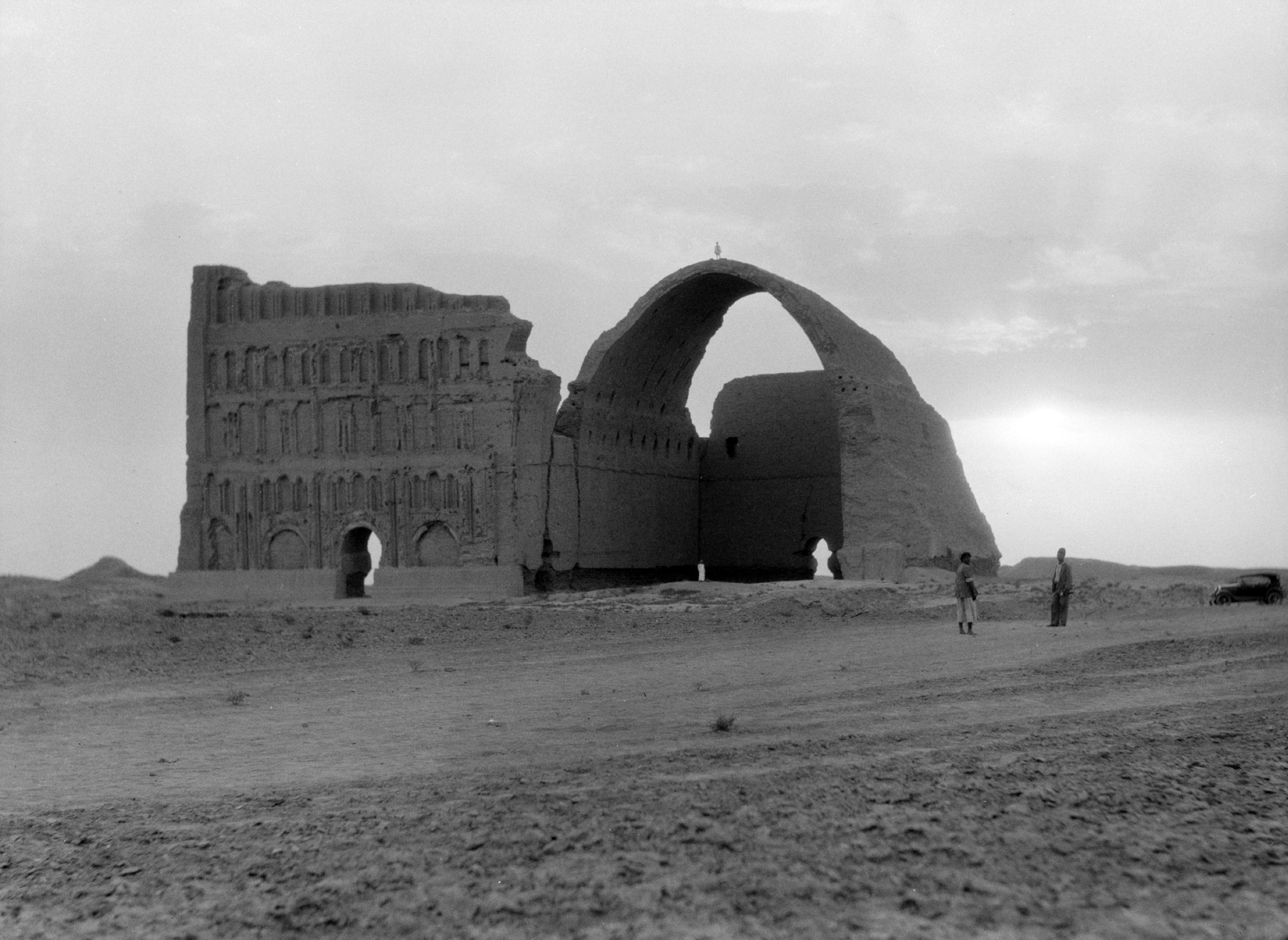
Taq Kasra

=== Human-made arches ===
- The Nubian ton is a burial vault, of Nubia, For greatest stability, the structure’s cross-section follows a catenary arch.
- The unfinished Saqqara ostracon has a catenary shape.
- In Iraq, the Arch of Ctesiphon, Taq Kasra has the shape of a catenary arch (6th century AD).
- The curves close in shape to catenary were used in arches of Ramesseum (13th century BC).
- The Gateway Arch in the American city of St. Louis (Missouri) is a catenary arch Due to more strength needed at the bottom, the bottom of this arch is wider than the top, so the actual shape is technically a "weighted catenary".

==== Bridges ====
- An example of a catenary bridge is the An-Lan Bridge, in China.

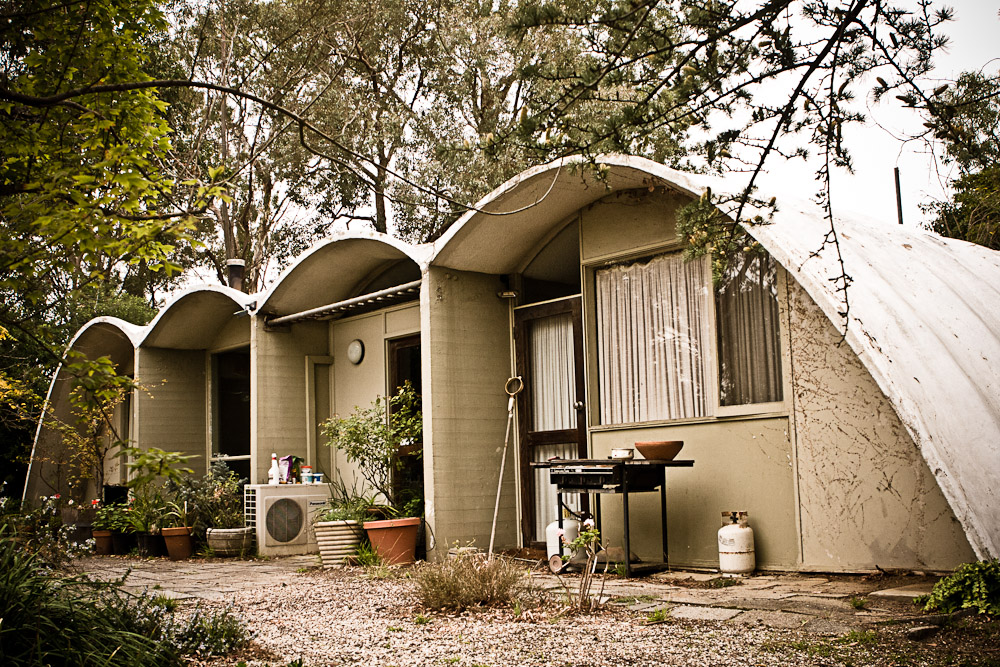
Rice House

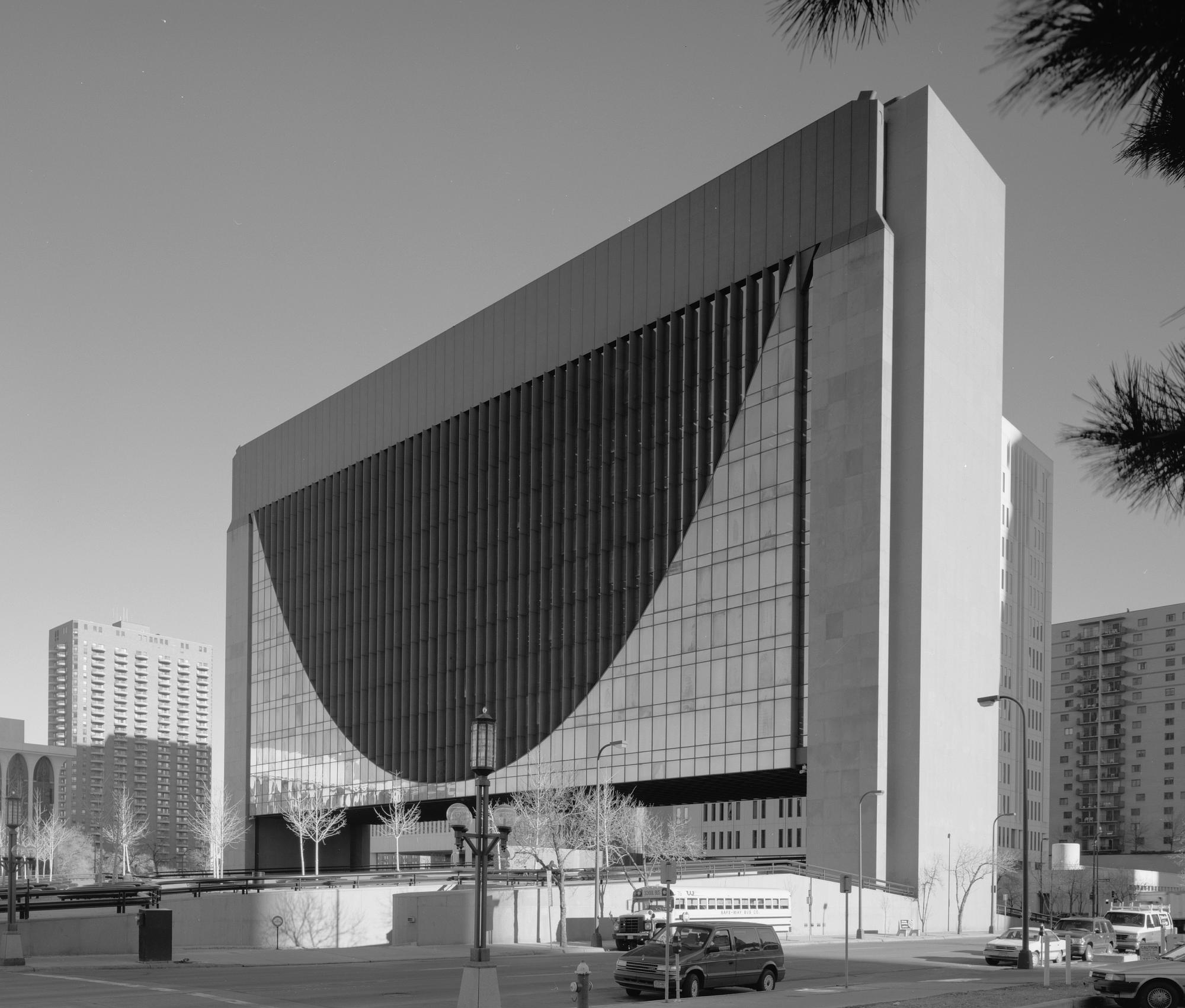
Marquette Plaza in Minneapolis

==== Residential structures ====
- The Rice House has catenary arches.
- Casa Mila was designed by Antoni Gaudi, who used many catenary arches
- The Icehotel in Sweden employs catenary arches.

==== Representational structures ====
- The former Federal Reserve Bank of Minneapolis (1973-1997), designed by Gunnar Birkerts, now known as Marquette Plaza, has been remodeled, but still visible is the catenary arch suspending the original building.

==== Buildings of transportation ====
- New York City’s Pennsylvania Station has a roof in the form of a catenary arch.
- The inside of Budapest’s Keleti Railway Station forms a catenary arch.
- The roof of Washington Dulles International Airport by Eero Saarinen is a suspended catenary curve.
- A catenary steel cable system supports the roof of Denver International Airport.

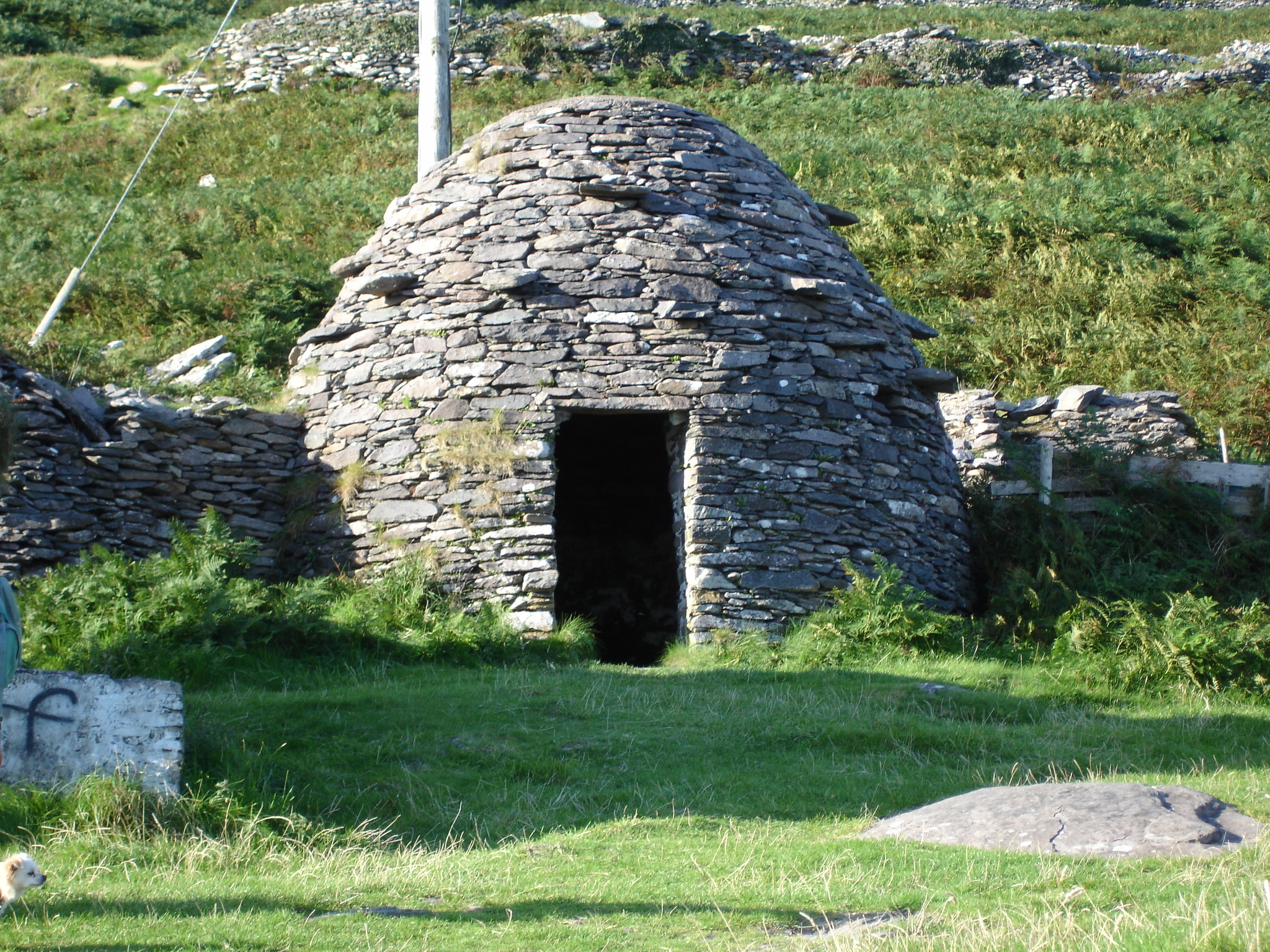
A beehive home (a clochan) on Dingle Peninsula, County Kerry, Ireland

=== Smaller domes ===
- Kilns are often designed with catenary arch cross-section.

==== Dwellings ====
- The beehive homes (clocháns) of Ireland’s Skellig Michael have a cross-section that follows the style of a catenary arch.
- Cameroon's musgum mud huts have a catenary cross-section.
- Igloos are designed with a catenary arch cross-section. This shape offers an optimal balance between height and diameter, avoiding the risk of collapsing under the weight of compacted snow.

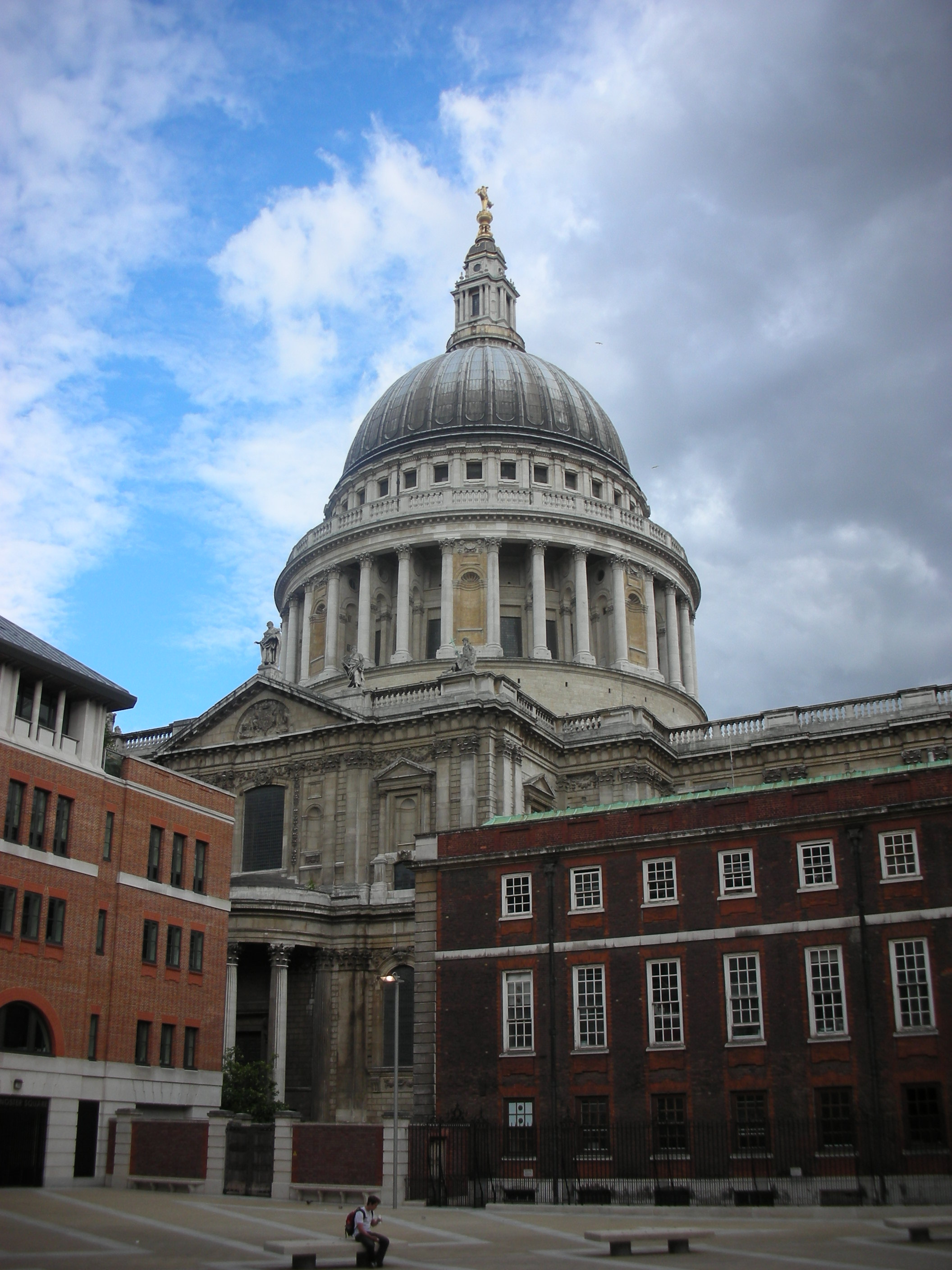
St Paul's Cathedral's dome

=== Domes of cathedrals and churches ===
- Brunelleschi's Dome
- King’s College Chapel, in Cambridge, England
- St Paul's Dome
- Sagrada Família
- Church of Colònia Güell and other buildings designed by Antoni Gaudí

== See also ==
- Arch bridge
- Gothic arch
- Lancet window
- Mathematics and architecture
- Simple suspension bridge
- Steel catenary riser

== Sources ==
- Bradley, R.A.; Gohnert, M. (2022-09-02). "Parametric study of the catenary dome under gravity load". Current Perspectives and New Directions in Mechanics, Modelling and Design of Structural Systems. London: CRC Press. doi:10.1201/9781003348443-130. ISBN 978-1-003-34844-3.
- González, Genaro; Samper, Albert; Herrera, Blas (2018). "Classification by Type of the Arches in Gaudí's Palau Güell". Nexus Network Journal. 20 (1): 173–186. doi:10.1007/s00004-017-0355-7. hdl:20.500.11797/imarina5689818. ISSN 1590-5896.
- Hourihane, C. (2012). "Arch". The Grove Encyclopedia of Medieval Art and Architecture. Vol. 1. Oxford University Press. pp. 129–134. ISBN 978-0-19-539536-5.
- Osserman, Robert (February 2010). "Mathematics of the Gateway Arch" (PDF). Notices of the American Mathematical Society. 57 (2): 220–229. ISSN 0002-9920.
