= Bouillier =

Bouillier is a surname of French origin. Notable people with the surname include:

- Francisque Bouillier (1813–1899), French philosopher
- Grégoire Bouillier (born 1960), French memoirist

== See also ==
- Bobillier (disambiguation)
