= Bobillier =

Bobillier may refer to:

- Étienne Bobillier (1798–1840), French mathematician
- Nadège Bobillier (born 1988), French figure skater
- Bobillier (crater), a lunar crater
