= Weighted catenary =

Type of catenary curve

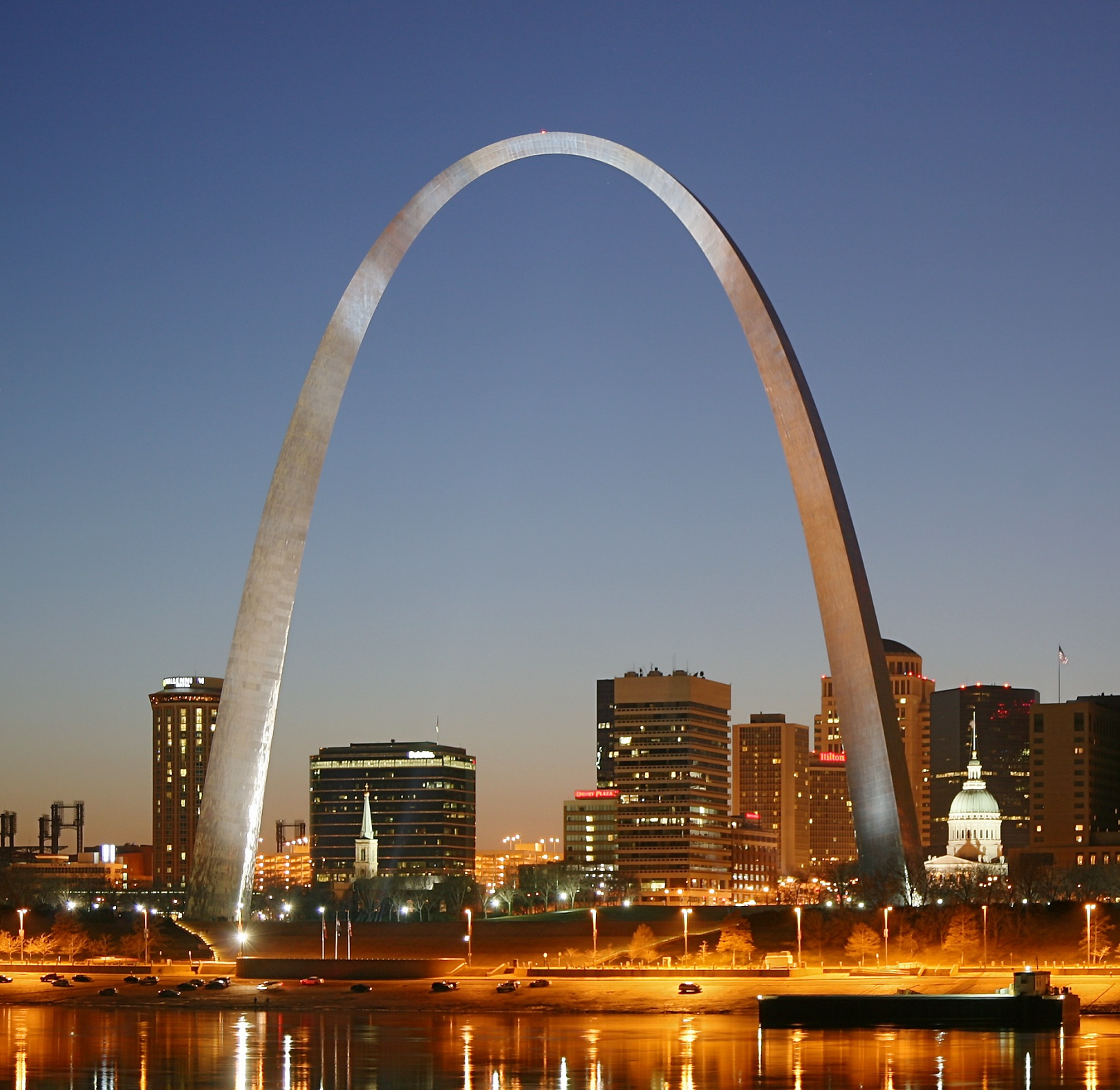
The Gateway Arch is a weighted catenary: thick at the bottom, thin at the top.

A weighted catenary (also flattened catenary, was defined by William Rankine as transformed catenary and thus sometimes called Rankine curve) is a catenary curve, but of a special form: while a catenary is the curve formed by a chain under its own weight, a weighted catenary is the curve formed if the chain's weight is not consistent along its length. Formally, a "regular" catenary has the equation

$$y = a \, \cosh \left(\frac{x}{a}\right) = \frac{a\left(e^\frac{x}{a} + e^{-\frac{x}{a}}\right)}{2}$$

for a given value of a. A weighted catenary has the equation

$$y = b \, \cosh \left(\frac{x}{a}\right) = \frac{b\left(e^\frac{x}{a} + e^{-\frac{x}{a}}\right)}{2}$$

and now two constants enter: a and b.

== Significance ==
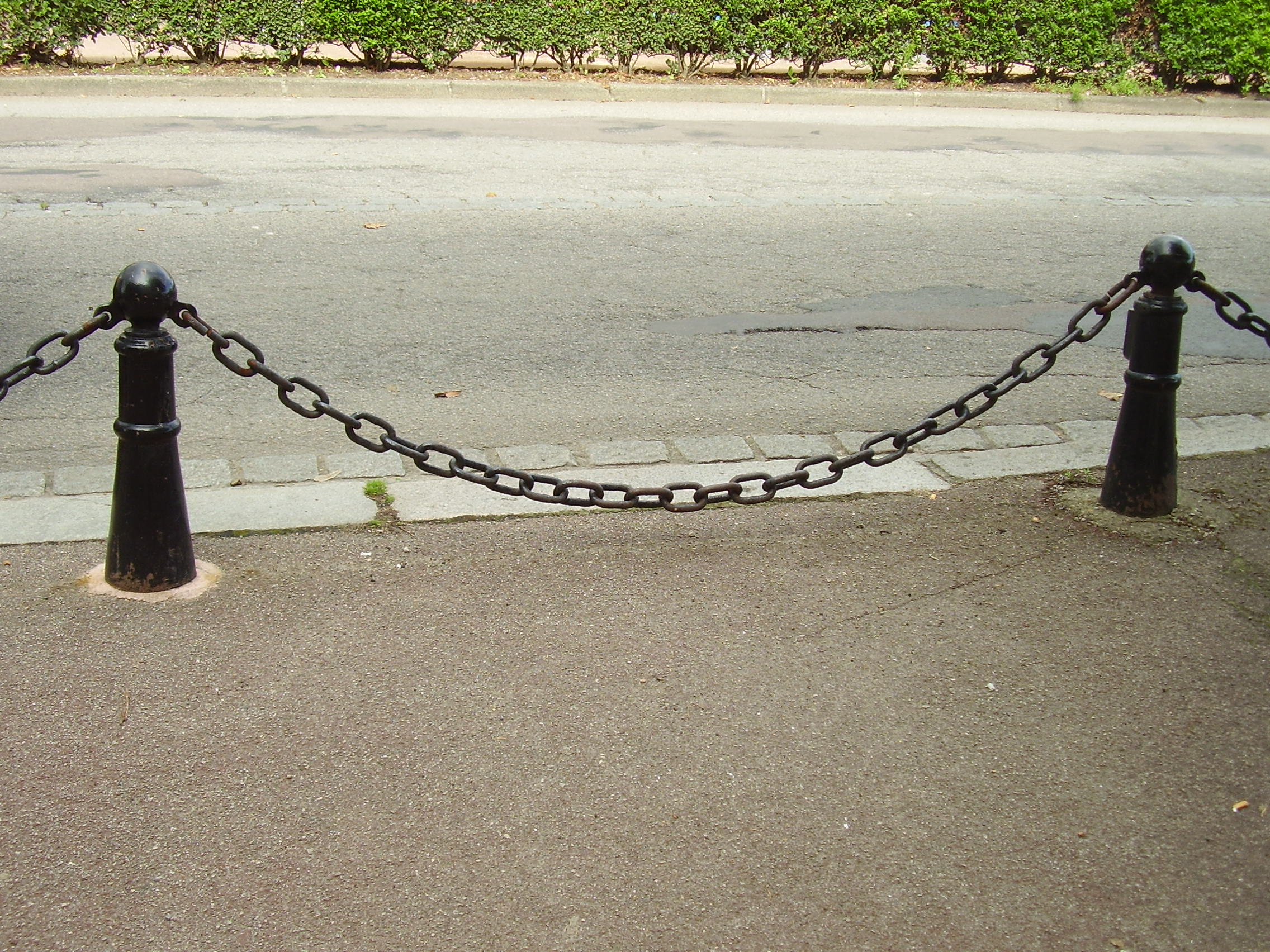
A hanging chain is a regular catenary — and is not weighted.

A freestanding catenary arch has a uniform thickness. However, if

1. the arch is not of uniform thickness,
2. the arch supports more than its own weight,
3. or if gravity varies,

it becomes more complex. A weighted catenary is needed.

The aspect ratio of a weighted catenary (or other curve) describes a rectangular frame containing the selected fragment of the curve theoretically continuing to the infinity.

== Examples ==
The Gateway Arch in the American city of St. Louis, Missouri, is the most famous example of a weighted catenary.

Simple suspension bridges use weighted catenaries.

== External links and references ==
=== General links ===
- One general-interest link

=== On the Gateway arch ===
- Mathematics of the Gateway Arch
- On the Gateway Arch
- A weighted catenary graphed

=== Commons ===
- Category:Catenary
- Category:Arches
