= Étienne Bobillier =

French mathematician (1798–1840)

- Born: 17 April 1798; Lons-le-Saunier, France
- Died: 22 March 1840 (aged 41); Châlons-en-Champagne, France
- Known for: Mathematician

Étienne Bobillier (17 April 1798 – 22 March 1840) was a French mathematician.

He was born in Lons-le-Saunier, France. At the age of 19, he was accepted into the École Polytechnique and studied there for a year. However, due to a shortage of money, in 1818 he became an instructor in mathematics at the École des Arts et Métiers in Châlons-sur-Marne. In 1829, he was sent to Angers to be director of studies. The following year he served in the National Guard during the 1830 revolution. In 1832 he returned to Châlons after his post was abolished, and was promoted to professor.

In 1836 he began suffering from health problems, but continued teaching; declining to take a leave to recuperate. As a result, he died in Châlons at the relatively early age of 41.

He is noted for his work on geometry, particularly the algebraic treatment of geometric surfaces and the polar of curves. He also worked on statics and the catenary.

The crater Bobillier on the Moon is named after him.

== Works ==
- Cours de géométrie, 1849
- Principes d'algèbre, 1865
