= Saqqara ostracon =

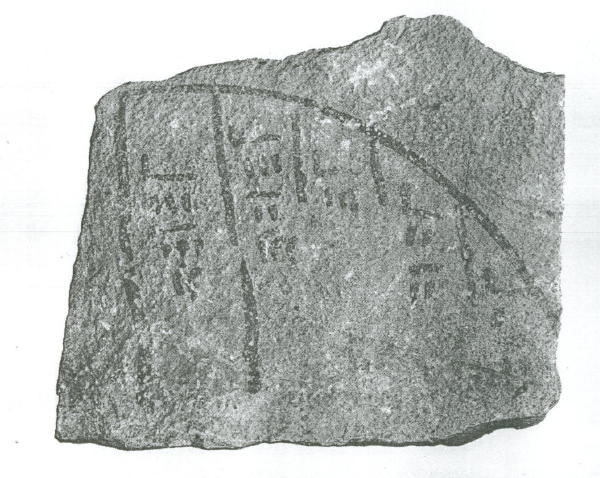
Saqqara ostracon

The Saqqara ostracon is an ostracon, an Egyptian antiquity tracing to the period of Djoser (2650 BC).

== Excavation ==
It was excavated in or near 1925 in Djoser's Pyramid in Saqqara, Egypt.

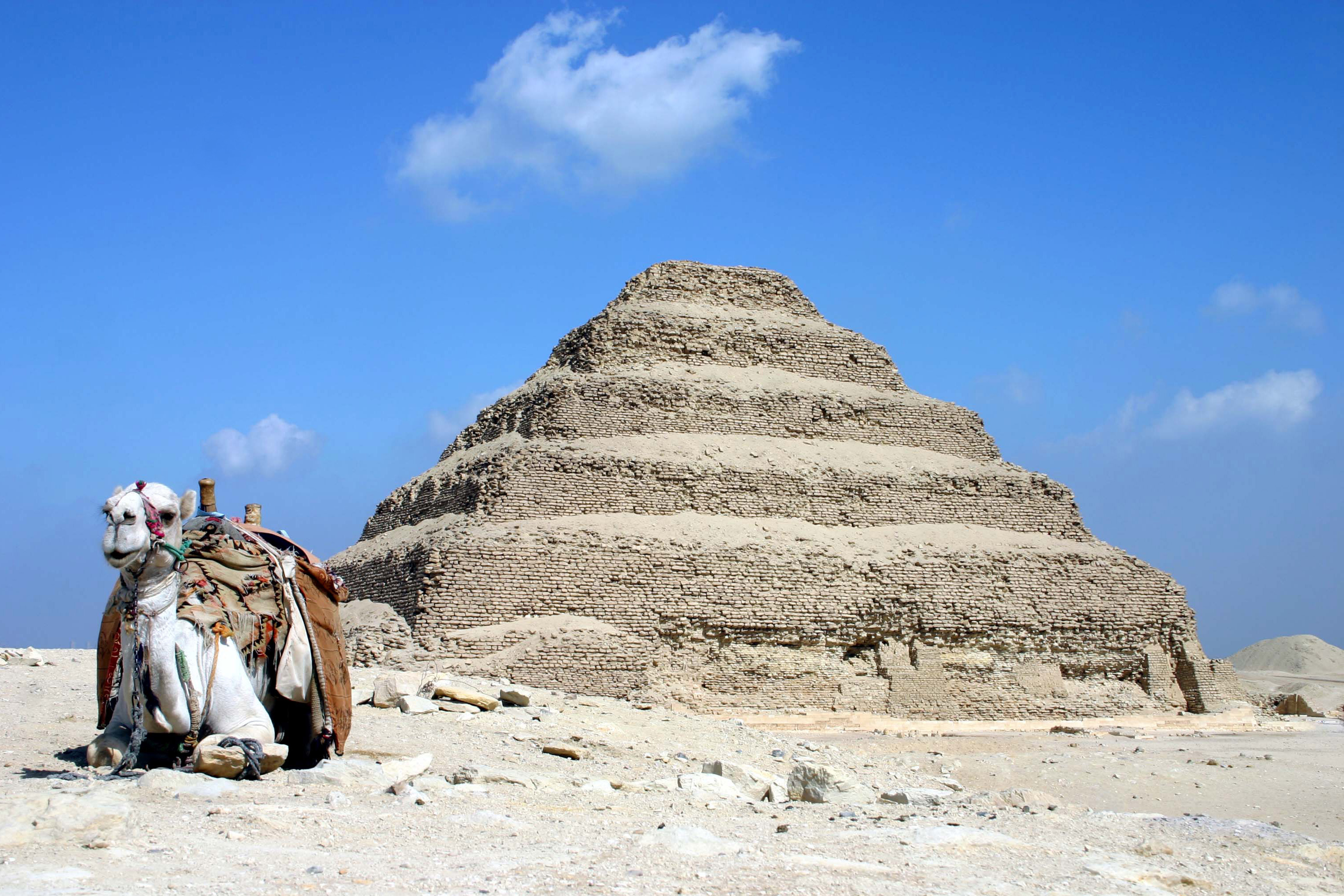
Djoser's Pyramid, where the ostracon was found

== Description ==
It is an apparently complete flake made of limestone. It is 15 × 17.5 × 5 cm. In a few places, small portions of the surface seem to have been scaled away. It appears to date to the period of Djoser (~2650 BC).

== Units written about ==
The ostracon has mentioned several units:

- Cubits
- Palms
- Fingers

== The curve ==
The curve appears catenary.

== See also ==
- Ancient Egyptian units of measurement
- Ancient Egyptian mathematics
- Ancient Egyptian technology
