= Steel catenary riser =

A steel catenary riser (SCR) is a common method of connecting a subsea pipeline to a deepwater floating or fixed oil production platform. SCRs are used to transfer fluids like oil, gas, injection water, etc. between the platforms and the pipelines.

== Description ==
In the offshore industry the word catenary is used as an adjective or noun with a meaning wider than is its historical meaning in mathematics. Thus, an SCR that uses a rigid, steel pipe that has a considerable bending stiffness is described as a catenary. That is because in the scale of depth of the ocean, the bending stiffness of a rigid pipe has little effect on the shape of the suspended span of an SCR. The shape assumed by the SCR is controlled mainly by weight, buoyancy and hydrodynamic forces due to currents and waves. The shape of the SCR is well approximated by stiffened catenary equations. In preliminary considerations, in spite of using conventional, rigid steel pipe, the shape of the SCR can be also approximated with the use of ideal catenary equations, when some further loss of accuracy is acceptable. Ideal catenary equations are used historically to describe the shape of a chain suspended between points in space. A chain line has by definition a zero bending stiffness and those described with the ideal catenary equations use infinitesimally short links.

SCRs were invented by Dr. Carl G. Langner P.E., NAE who described an SCR together with a flexible joint used to accommodate angular deflections of the top region of the SCR relative a support platform, as the platform and the SCR move in currents and waves. SCRs use thousands of feet of long unsupported pipe spans. Complex dynamics, hydrodynamics, including vortex induced vibrations (VIVs) and physics of pipe interactions with the seabed are involved. Those are tough on materials used to build the SCR pipe. Dr. Langner had carried out years of analytical and design work before an application for his US patent was filed. That work started before 1969, and it was reflected in internal Shell documents, which are confidential, but a patent on an early 'Bare Foot' SCR design was issued. VIVs are predominantly controlled with a use of devices attached to the SCR pipe. Those can be for example VIV suppression devices, like helicoidal strakes or fairings that considerably reduce VIV amplitudes. The development of VIV prediction engineering programs, like for example the SHEAR7 program, is an ongoing process that originated in cooperation between MIT and Shell Exploration & Production in parallel to the development of the SCR concept, while having SCR development in mind.

The rigid pipe of the SCR forms a catenary between its hang-off point on the floating or rigid platform, and the seabed. A free-hanging SCR assumes a shape roughly similar to the letter 'J'. A catenary of a Steel Lazy Wave Riser (SLWR) consists in fact of at least three catenary segments. The top and the seabed segments of the catenary have negative submerged weight, and their curvatures 'bulge' towards the seabed. The middle segment has buoyant material attached along its entire length, so that the ensemble of the steel pipe and the buoyancy is positively buoyant. Accordingly, the curvature of the buoyant segment 'bulges' upwards (inverted catenary), and its shape can also be well approximated with the same stiffened or ideal catenary equations. The positively and negatively buoyant segments are tangent to each other at the points where they join. The overall catenary shape of the SLWR has inflection points at those locations. SLWRs were first installed on a turret moored FPSO offshore Brazil (BC-10, Shell) in 2009, even though Lazy Wave configuration flexible risers had been in a wide use for several decades beforehand.

The deepest application of Lazy Wave SCRs (SLWRs) is at present on the Stones turret-moored FPSO (Shell), which is moored in 9,500 feet water depth in the Gulf of Mexico. The Stones FPSO turret features a disconnectable buoy, so that the vessel with the crew can be disconnected from the buoy supporting the SLWRs, and moved to a suitable shelter before an arrival of a hurricane.

The SCR pipe and a short segment of pipe lying on the seabed use 'dynamic' pipe, i.e. steel pipe having slightly greater wall thickness than the pipeline wall thickness, in order to sustain dynamic bending and steel material fatigue associated in the touch-down zone of the SCR. Beyond that the SCR is typically extended with a rigid pipeline, but use of a flexible pipeline is also feasible. The risers are typically 8-12 inches in diameter and operate at a pressure of 2000-5000 psi. Designs beyond those ranges of pipe sizes and operating pressures are also feasible.

Free hanging SCRs were first used by Shell on the Auger tension leg platform (TLP) in 1994 which was moored in 872 m of water. Proving to Shell that the SCR concept was technically sound for use on the Auger TLP was a major achievement of Dr. Carl G. Langner. It was a technological leap. The acceptance of the SCR concept by the entire Offshore Industry followed relatively quickly. SCRs have performed reliably on oil and gas fields all over the world since their first Auger installation.
