= Rice House, Eltham =

Coordinates: 37°42′35″S 145°08′17″E

The Rice House is a residence located at 69 Ryans Road, Eltham, Victoria, Australia, built from 1952-53. Designed by Melbourne architect Kevin Borland for a young couple, whose open mindedness and excitement for progressive/alternative ways of living allowed quite a different archetype for housing, the house is notable for its unusual construction technique and use of materials. Rice House was the first experiment of three architectural explorations in Melbourne.

== Clients ==
Young artist Harrie Rice and wife Lorna were a young couple whose exposure to The Age RVIA Small Homes Service saw them fall in love with modern housing design. An attempt to meet with Kevin Boyd at RVIA Small Homes Service led Harrie and Lorna to meet their architect Kevin Borland.

== Description ==
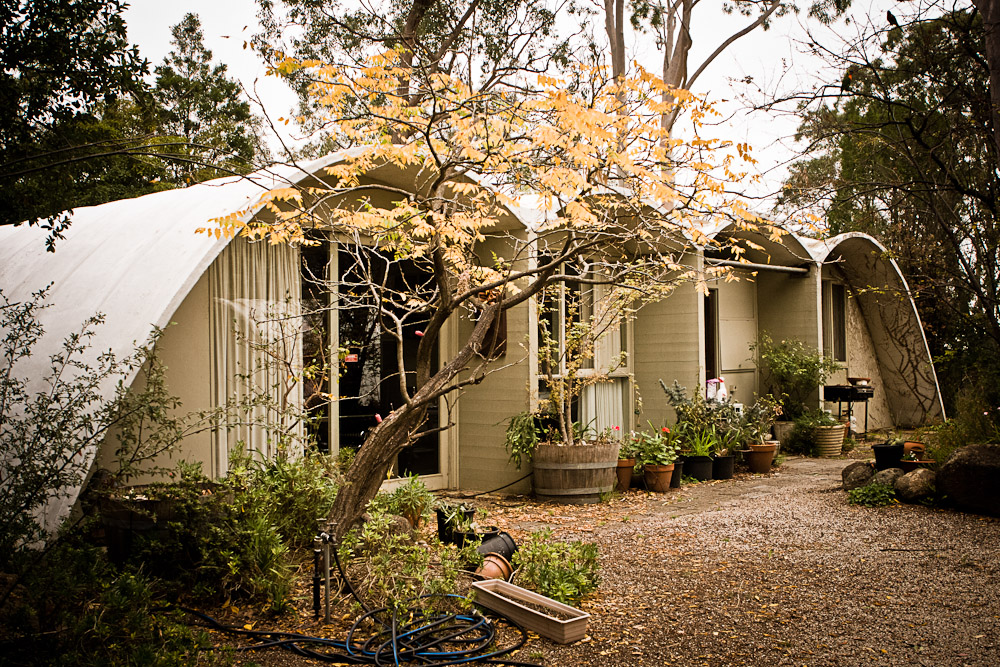
Kevin Borland's Rice House

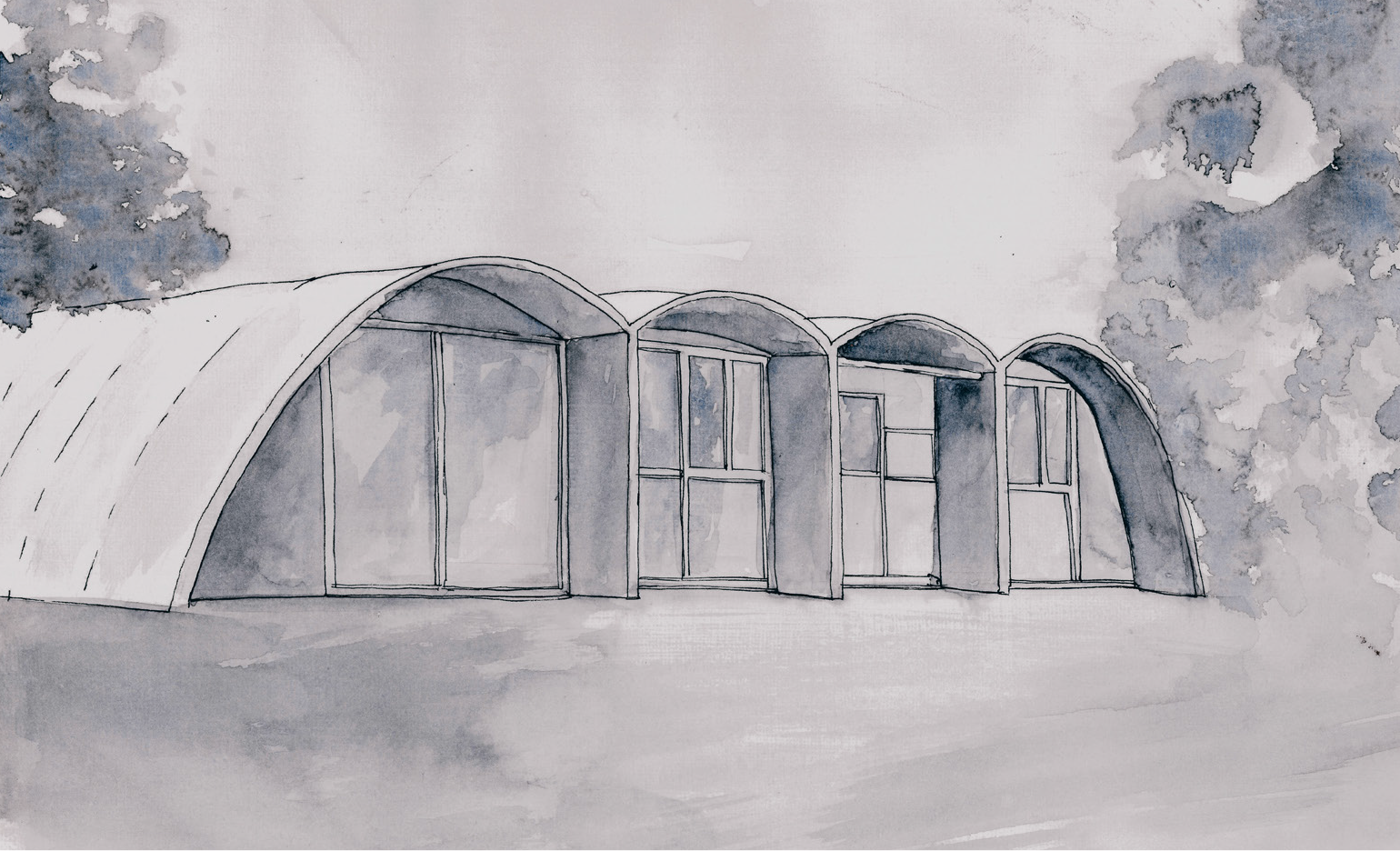
Kevin Borland's Rice House

Rice House Floor Plan

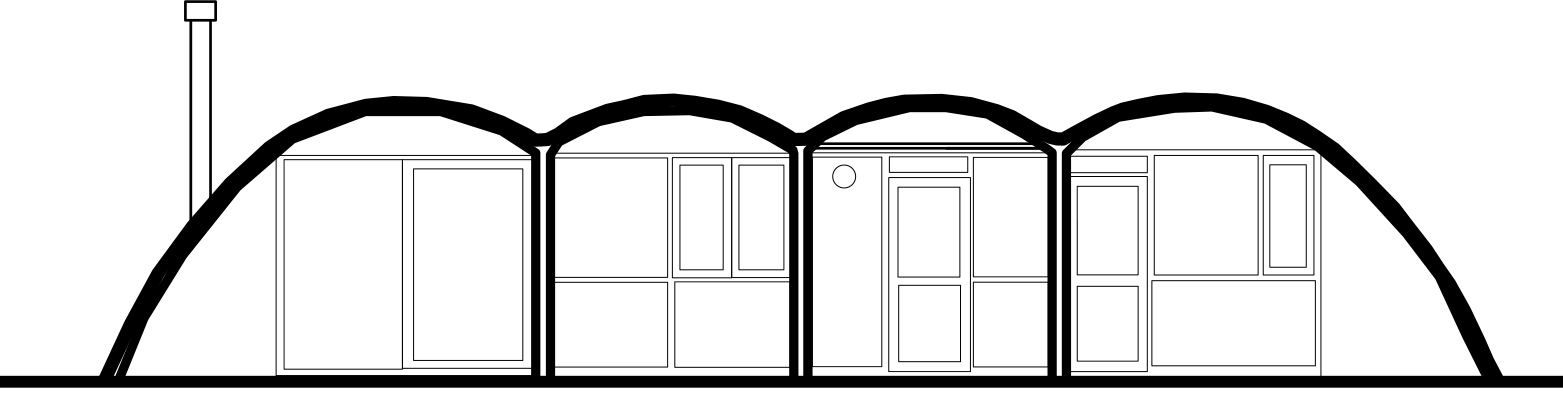
North Elevation of Kevin Borland's Rice House

=== Interior ===
The interior of the house was comparable to caves occupying small spaces and volumes. The invention of these structural moves were developed by Borland using metal columns for the front porch will later failed and buckled due to the expansion of the material and the movement of the form work.

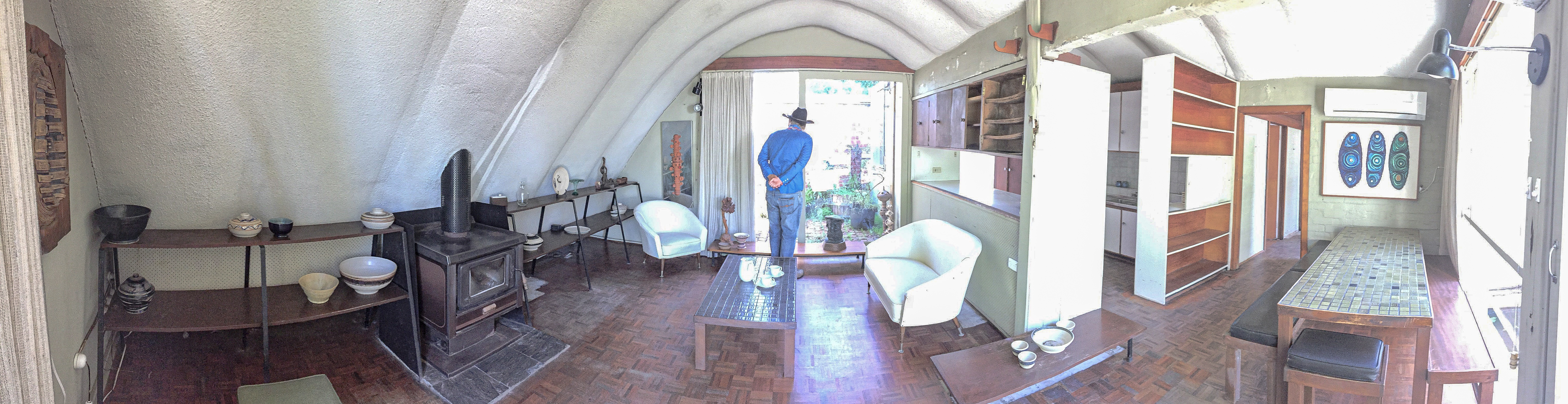
Rice House interior

=== Construction technique ===
Rice House Construction Stage

Arched structural formwork

Image showing the anchoring details for the original concrete walkway

Borland turned to a method that had been used by the Italian Air Force during World War 2 for its hangar construction in North Africa. A system which had then later been patented by J H de W Waller, an Australian/Irish engineer.

== Key influences ==
- Ralph Erskine, House in Lissma, Sweden 1940
- Roy Grounds, George Peardon homestead, West Victoria, 1949, (unbuilt)
- Roy Grounds, The Douglas Wilkie, Igloo-form house, Kew, 1951 (unbuilt)
- Peter Burns

== Architectural relevance ==
This particular technique was the first of three buildings to be constructed. The other buildings include the Wood House and Supermarket designed by Robin Boyd in 1952, and Bellfield Community Centre designed by Kevin Borland and Peter McIntyre in 1953 all in which directly reference the Rice House.
