= Bobillier (crater) =

Crater on the Moon

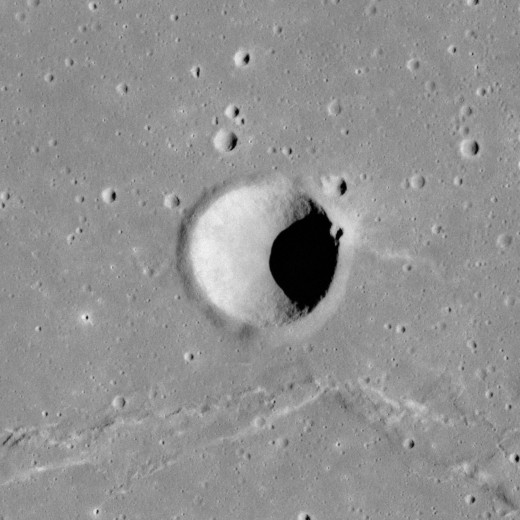
- Apollo 17 Mapping Camera image
- Coordinates: 19.6°N 15.5°E
- Diameter: 6.04 km (3.75 mi)
- Depth: 1.2 km (0.75 mi)
- Colongitude: 344° at sunrise
- Eponym: Étienne Bobillier

Bobillier is a tiny, cup-shaped lunar impact crater in the southwest part of Mare Serenitatis. The outer ejecta of this impact has subsequently been flooded by mare material around 100 m thick. Bobillier lies to the north-northwest of the crater Bessel. To the south and west is a wrinkle ridge designated Dorsum Buckland.

Previously identified as Bessel E, this crater is named after French geometer Étienne Bobillier. Its designation was adopted by the International Astronomical Union in 1976.
