= Plateau's problem =

To find the minimal surface with a given boundary

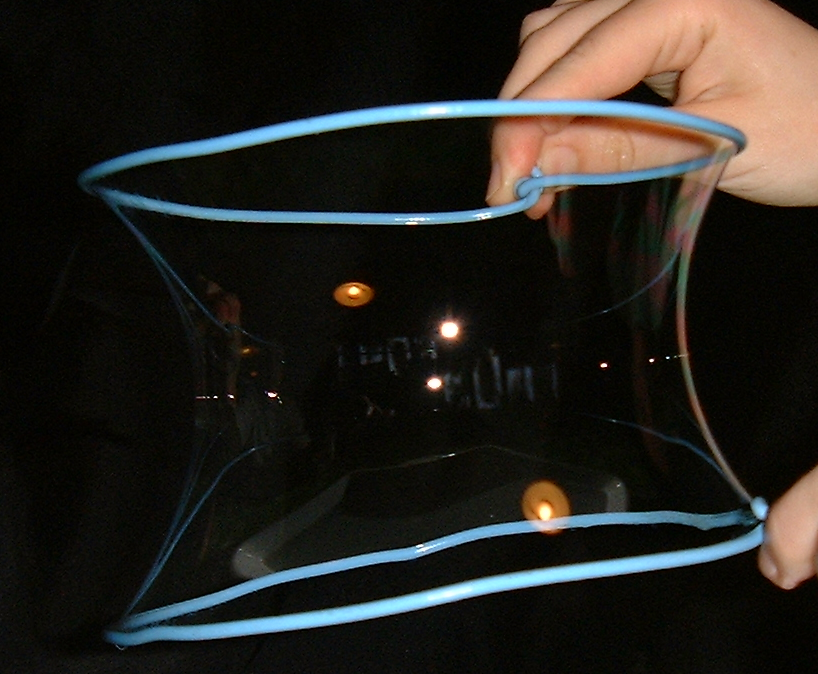
A soap bubble in the shape of a catenoid

In mathematics, Plateau's problem is to show the existence of a minimal surface with a given boundary. The problem is considered part of the calculus of variations. The existence and regularity problems are part of geometric measure theory. It is named after Joseph Plateau.

== History ==
The problem was first raised by Joseph-Louis Lagrange in 1760. However, it is named after Joseph Plateau, who experimented with soap films.

Various specialized forms of the problem were solved, but it was only in 1930 that general solutions were found in the context of mappings (immersions) independently by Jesse Douglas and Tibor Radó. Their methods were quite different: Radó's work built on the previous work of René Garnier and held only for rectifiable simple closed curves, whereas Douglas used completely new ideas with his result holding for an arbitrary simple closed curve. Both relied on setting up minimization problems: Douglas minimized the now-named Douglas integral, while Radó minimized the "energy". Douglas went on to be awarded the Fields Medal in 1936 for his efforts.

== In higher dimensions ==
The extension of the problem to higher dimensions (that is, for $k$-dimensional surfaces in $n$-dimensional space) turns out to be much more difficult to study. Moreover, while the solutions to the original problem are always regular, it turns out that the solutions to the extended problem may have singularities if $k \leq n - 2$. In the hypersurface case where $k = n - 1$, singularities occur only for $n \geq 8$. An example of such singular solution of the Plateau problem is the Simons cone, a cone over $S^3 \times S^3$ in $\mathbb{R}^8$ that was first described by Jim Simons and was shown to be an area minimizer by Bombieri, De Giorgi and Giusti. To solve the extended problem in certain special cases, the theory of perimeters (De Giorgi) for codimension 1 and the theory of rectifiable currents (Federer and Fleming) for higher codimension have been developed. The theory guarantees existence of codimension 1 solutions that are smooth away from a closed set of Hausdorff dimension $n-8$. In the case of higher codimension Almgren proved existence of solutions with singular set of dimension at most $k-2$ in his regularity theorem. S. X. Chang, a student of Almgren, built upon Almgren’s work to show that the singularities of 2-dimensional area minimizing integral currents (in arbitrary codimension) form a finite discrete set.

The axiomatic approach of Jenny Harrison and Harrison Pugh treats a wide variety of special cases. In particular, they solve the anisotropic Plateau problem in arbitrary dimension and codimension for any collection of rectifiable sets satisfying a combination of general homological, cohomological or homotopical spanning conditions. A different proof of Harrison-Pugh's results were obtained by Camillo De Lellis, Francesco Ghiraldin and Francesco Maggi.

== Physical applications ==
Physical soap films are more accurately modeled by the $(M, 0, \Delta)$-minimal sets of Frederick Almgren, but the lack of a compactness theorem makes it difficult to prove the existence of an area minimizer. In this context, a persistent open question has been the existence of a least-area soap film. Ernst Robert Reifenberg solved such a "universal Plateau's problem" for boundaries which are homeomorphic to single embedded spheres.

== See also ==
- Double bubble theorem
- Dirichlet principle
- Plateau's laws
- Stretched grid method
- Bernstein's problem
