= Chen–Gackstatter surface =

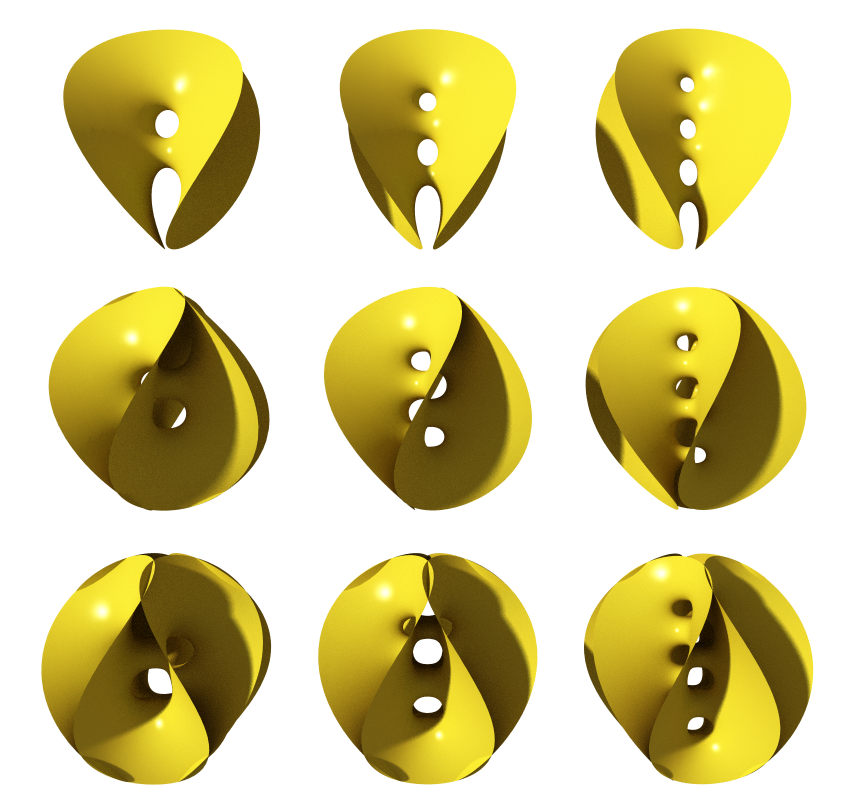
The first nine Chen–Gackstatter surfaces.

In differential geometry, the Chen–Gackstatter surface family (or the Chen–Gackstatter–Thayer surface family) is a family of minimal surfaces that generalize the Enneper surface by adding handles, giving it nonzero topological genus.

They are not embedded, and have Enneper-like ends. The members $M_{ij}$ of the family are indexed by the number of extra handles i and the winding number of the Enneper end; the total genus is ij and the total Gaussian curvature is $-4\pi(i+1)j$. It has been shown that $M_{11}$ is the only genus one orientable complete minimal surface of total curvature $-8\pi$.

It has been conjectured that continuing to add handles to the surfaces will in the limit converge to the Scherk's second surface (for j = 1) or the saddle tower family for j > 1.
