= Minimal surface of revolution =

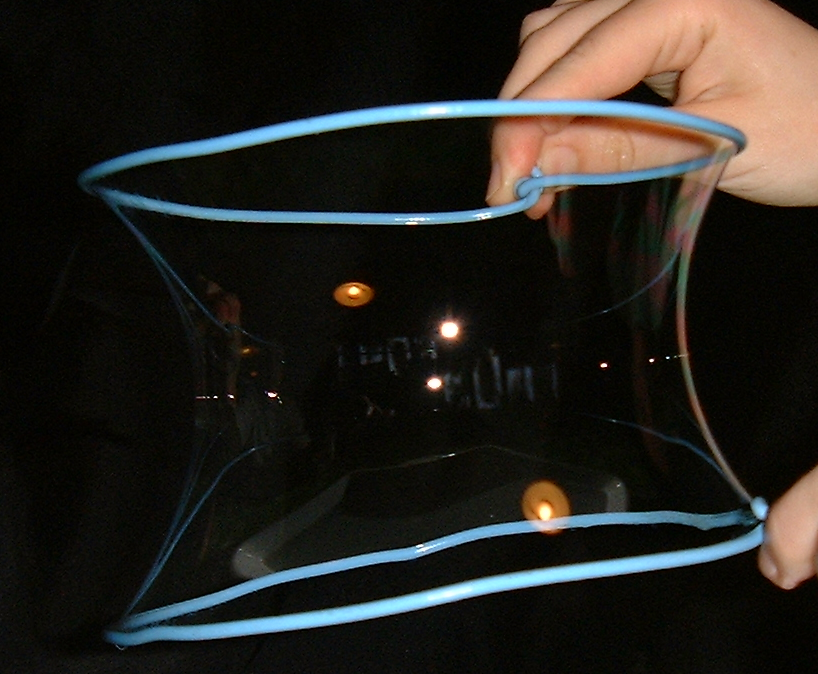
Stretching a soap film between two parallel circular wire loops generates a catenoidal minimal surface of revolution

In mathematics, a minimal surface of revolution or minimum surface of revolution is a surface of revolution defined from two points in a half-plane, whose boundary is the axis of revolution of the surface. It is generated by a curve that lies in the half-plane and connects the two points; among all the surfaces that can be generated in this way, it is the one that minimizes the surface area. A basic problem in the calculus of variations is finding the curve between two points that produces this minimal surface of revolution.

== Relation to minimal surfaces ==
A minimal surface of revolution is a subtype of minimal surface. A minimal surface is defined not as a surface of minimal area, but as a surface with a mean curvature of 0. Since a mean curvature of 0 is a necessary condition of a surface of minimal area, all minimal surfaces of revolution are minimal surfaces, but not all minimal surfaces are minimal surfaces of revolution. As a point forms a circle when rotated about an axis, finding the minimal surface of revolution is equivalent to finding the minimal surface passing through two circular wireframes. A physical realization of a minimal surface of revolution is soap film stretched between two parallel circular wires: the soap film naturally takes on the shape with least surface area.

== Catenoid solution ==
A catenoid

If the half-plane containing the two points and the axis of revolution is given Cartesian coordinates, making the axis of revolution into the x-axis of the coordinate system, then the curve connecting the points may be interpreted as the graph of a function. If the Cartesian coordinates of the two given points are $(x_1,y_1)$, $(x_2,y_2)$, then the area of the surface generated by a nonnegative differentiable function $f$ may be expressed mathematically as

$$2\pi\int_{x_1}^{x_2} f(x) \sqrt{1+f'(x)^2} dx$$

and the problem of finding the minimal surface of revolution becomes one of finding the function that minimizes this integral, subject to the boundary conditions that $f(x_1)=y_1$ and $f(x_2)=y_2$. In this case, the optimal curve will necessarily be a catenary. The axis of revolution is the directrix of the catenary, and the minimal surface of revolution will thus be a catenoid.

== Goldschmidt solution ==
Solutions based on discontinuous functions may also be defined. In particular, for some placements of the two points the optimal solution is generated by a discontinuous function that is nonzero at the two points and zero everywhere else. This function leads to a surface of revolution consisting of two circular disks, one for each point, connected by a degenerate line segment along the axis of revolution. This is known as a Goldschmidt solution after German mathematician Carl Wolfgang Benjamin Goldschmidt, who announced his discovery of it in his 1831 paper "Determinatio superficiei minimae rotatione curvae data duo puncta jungentis circa datum axem ortae" ("Determination of the surface-minimal rotation curve given two joined points about a given axis of origin").

To continue the physical analogy of soap film given above, these Goldschmidt solutions can be visualized as instances in which the soap film breaks as the circular wires are stretched apart. However, in a physical soap film, the connecting line segment would not be present. Additionally, if a soap film is stretched in this way, there is a range of distances within which the catenoid solution is still feasible but has greater area than the Goldschmidt solution, so the soap film may stretch into a configuration in which the area is a local minimum but not a global minimum. For distances greater than this range, the catenary that defines the catenoid crosses the x-axis and leads to a self-intersecting surface, so only the Goldschmidt solution is feasible.
