= James Hoffman =

American inventor

James Hoffman is a software engineer and inventor who has worked in scientific visualization and was instrumental in producing the first visualization of Costa's minimal surface. His scientific visualizations have been published in Scientific American and Nature, among other journals. Most recently, Hoffman has been involved in the solar start-up company Sun Synchrony, which is developing his solar inventions.

== Scientific visualizations ==
James Hoffman has created software for scientific visualization, particularly of surface geometries studied in differential geometry. While a graduate student at the University of Massachusetts Amherst, James was enlisted by mathematician David Hoffman to help prove an important result in minimal surface geometry, discovering the first new examples of complete embedded minimal surfaces in more than one hundred years. The first example, the Costa surface, was described in 1983 by Brazilian graduate student Celso Costa as an equation, but a proof that it was embedded (lacked self-intersections) was provided by David Hoffman and William Meeks, who used computer visualizations created by James to see that the surface was embedded and dissect it to prove that it was. This finding, followed by the discovery of scores of other surfaces and families of surfaces illustrated by Hoffman's computer graphics, overturned a century-old conjecture that the only examples of such minimal surfaces where the plane, catenoid, and helicoid.

Hoffman's work has been featured in articles in Science News, Scientific American, and Nature, and he has co-authored papers in Science and Macromolecules. He is credited with involvement in the discovery of new three-dimensional morphologies for modeling block co-polymers, such as the Split-P surface (a hybrid of the P and G triply periodic surfaces), and derived the first level set formulation for the Lidinoid surface.

== Inventions ==
Hoffman is the co-author of a patent for an internal combustion engine with increased thermal efficiency. He is also the inventor of a solar panel using concentrating photovoltaics (CPV) for increased efficiency. He is President of the California solar company, Sun Synchrony, which is developing the prototype for Hoffman's CPV design, the ArcSol panel. Hoffman has also written several technical papers about the technology, including, 'Solar Panel Performance Survey', and 'Area Efficiency, Light Capture Efficiency, and their Maximization in Solar Tracking Arrays'.

== Publications ==
- Callahan, M. J., Hoffman, D. & Hoffman, J. T. (1988). "Computer graphics tools for the study of minimal surfaces". Communications of the ACM. 31 (6): 648–661. doi:10.1145/62959.62961. S2CID 1852626.
- Anderson, D. M., Bellare, J., Hoffman, J. T., Hoffman, D., Gunther, J. & Thomas, E. L. (1992). "Algorithms for the simulation of two-dimensional projections from structures determined by dividing surfaces". Journal of Colloid and Interface Science. 148 (2): 398–414. Bibcode:1992JCIS..148..398A. doi:10.1016/0021-9797(92)90179-P.
- David Hoffman (1996). "A New Turn for Archimedes". Nature. 384 (6604): 28–29. Bibcode:1996Natur.384...28H. doi:10.1038/384028a0. S2CID 33964709.
- Hoffman; Hoffman, J; Lee, VY; Iatrou, H; Avgeropoulos, A; Hadjichristidis, N; Miller, RD; Thomas, EL; et al. (1999). "Ordered Bicontinuous Nanoporous and Nanorelief Ceramic Films from Self Assembling Polymer Precursors". Science. 286 (5445): 1716–1719. doi:10.1126/science.286.5445.1716. PMID 10576734.
- Hoffman; et al. (October 2001). "Triply Periodic Bicontinuous Cubic Microdomain Morphologies by Symmetries" (abstract). Macromolecules. 34 (17): 6083–6089. Bibcode:2001MaMol..34.6083W. doi:10.1021/ma0019499.
- Hoffman, James and Ashley, Victoria. California Proposition 7: Redefining renewable energy to concentrate power, The East Bay Express, October 15, 2008.

== Websites designed by Hoffman ==
- Scientific Graphics Project, now hosted by the Mathematical Sciences Research Institute
- California Photon - Information and resources about renewable energy economy in California and beyond
- Sun Synchrony - Develops concentrating photovoltaic (CPV) systems for residential and commercial use.
