= Weierstrass–Enneper parameterization =

Construction for minimal surfaces

In mathematics, the Weierstrass–Enneper parameterization of minimal surfaces is a classical piece of differential geometry.

Alfred Enneper and Karl Weierstrass studied minimal surfaces as far back as 1863.

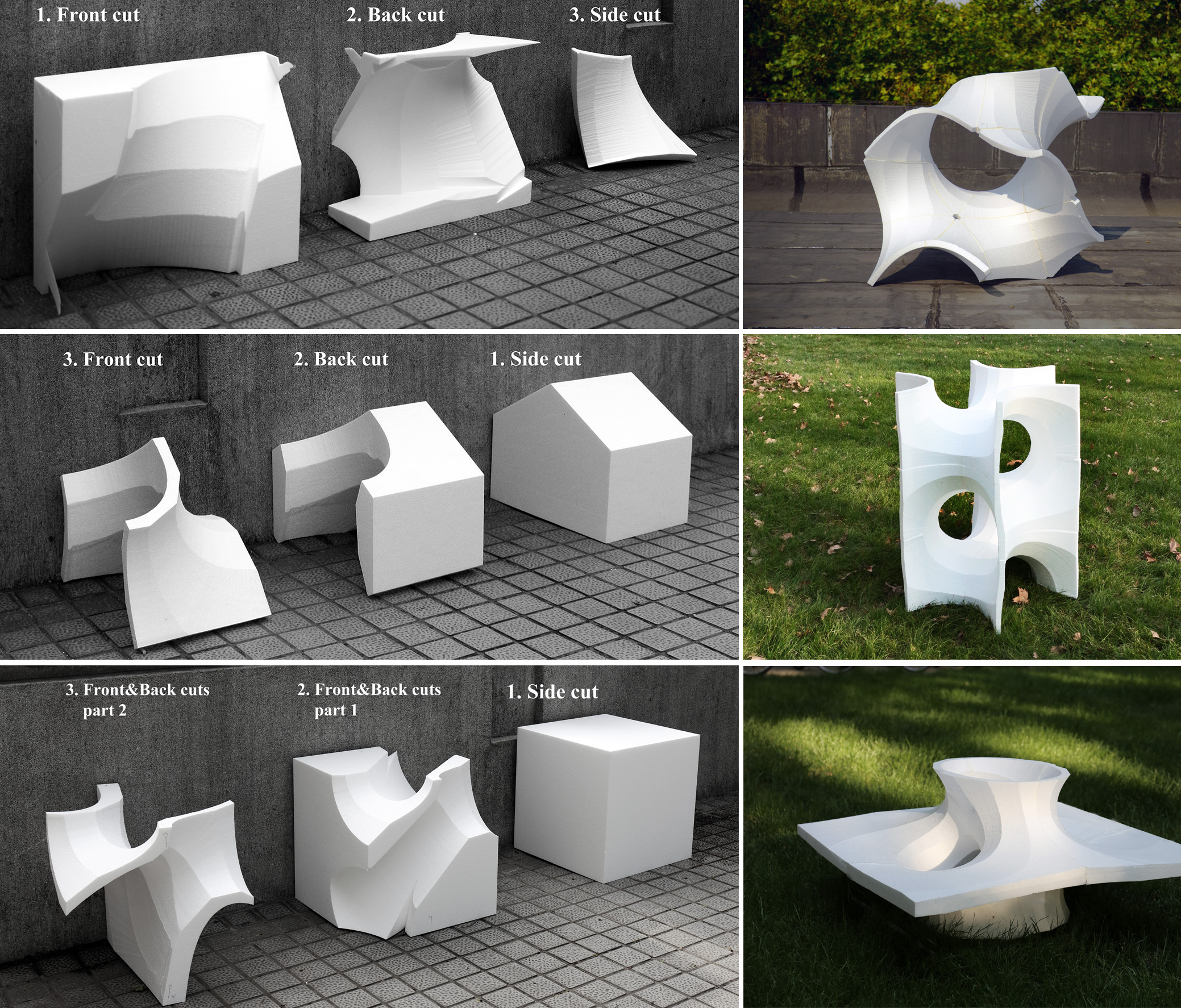
Weierstrass parameterization facilities fabrication of periodic minimal surfaces

Let $f$ and $g$ be functions on either the entire complex plane or the unit disk, where $g$ is meromorphic and $f$ is analytic, such that wherever $g$ has a pole of order $m$, $f$ has a zero of order $2m$ (or equivalently, such that the product $f g^2$ is holomorphic), and let $c_1,c_2,c_3$ be constants. Then the surface with coordinates $(x_1, x_2, x_3)$ is minimal, where the $x_k$ are defined using the real part of a complex integral, as follows:
$$\begin{align}
x_k(\zeta) &{}= \mathrm{Re} \left\{ \int_{0}^{\zeta} \varphi_{k}(z) \, dz \right\} + c_k , \qquad k=1,2,3 \\
\varphi_1 &{}= f(1-g^2)/2 \\
\varphi_2 &{}= i f(1+g^2)/2 \\
\varphi_3 &{}= fg
\end{align}$$

The converse is also true: every nonplanar minimal surface defined over a simply connected domain can be given a parametrization of this type.

For example, Enneper's surface has f(z) = 1, g(z) = z^{m}.

== Parametric surface of complex variables ==
The Weierstrass-Enneper model defines a minimal surface $X$ ($\Reals^3$) on a complex plane ($\Complex$). Let $\omega=u+v i$ (the complex plane as the $uv$ space), the Jacobian matrix of the surface can be written as a column of complex entries:
$$\mathbf{J} = \begin{bmatrix}
\left( 1 - g^2(\omega) \right)f(\omega)  \\
i\left( 1+ g^2(\omega) \right)f(\omega)  \\
2g(\omega) f(\omega)
\end{bmatrix}$$
where $f(\omega)$ and $g(\omega)$ are holomorphic functions of $\omega$.

The Jacobian $\mathbf{J}$ represents the two orthogonal tangent vectors of the surface:
$$\mathbf{X_u} = \begin{bmatrix}
\operatorname{Re}\mathbf{J}_1 \\
\operatorname{Re}\mathbf{J}_2  \\
\operatorname{Re} \mathbf{J}_3
\end{bmatrix}   \;\;\;\;
\mathbf{X_v} = \begin{bmatrix}
-\operatorname{Im}\mathbf{J}_1 \\
-\operatorname{Im}\mathbf{J}_2  \\
-\operatorname{Im} \mathbf{J}_3
\end{bmatrix}$$

The surface normal is given by
$$\mathbf{\hat{n}} =
\frac{\mathbf{X_u}\times \mathbf{X_v}}{|\mathbf{X_u}\times \mathbf{X_v}|} =
\frac{1}{| g|^2+1}
\begin{bmatrix}
2\operatorname{Re} g \\
2\operatorname{Im} g  \\
| g|^2-1
\end{bmatrix}$$

The Jacobian $\mathbf{J}$ leads to a number of important properties: $\mathbf{X_u} \cdot \mathbf{X_v}=0$, $\mathbf{X_u}^2 = \operatorname{Re}(\mathbf{J}^2)$, $\mathbf{X_v}^2 = \operatorname{Im}(\mathbf{J}^2)$, $\mathbf{X_{uu}} + \mathbf{X_{vv}}=0$. The proofs can be found in Sharma's essay: The Weierstrass representation always gives a minimal surface. The derivatives can be used to construct the first fundamental form matrix:
$$\begin{bmatrix}
\mathbf{X_u} \cdot \mathbf{X_u} & \;\; \mathbf{X_u} \cdot \mathbf{X_v}\\
\mathbf{X_v} \cdot \mathbf{X_u} &  \;\;\mathbf{X_v} \cdot \mathbf{X_v}
\end{bmatrix}=
|f|^2(1+|g|^2)^2 \begin{bmatrix}
1 & 0 \\
0 & 1
\end{bmatrix},$$

which is isotropic and reflects the conformal property of the parametrization, and the second fundamental form matrix
$$\begin{bmatrix}
\mathbf{X_{uu}} \cdot \mathbf{\hat{n}} & \;\; \mathbf{X_{uv}} \cdot \mathbf{\hat{n}}\\
\mathbf{X_{vu}} \cdot \mathbf{\hat{n}} & \;\; \mathbf{X_{vv}} \cdot \mathbf{\hat{n}}
\end{bmatrix}$$

Finally, a point $\omega_t$ on the complex plane maps to a point $\mathbf{X}$ on the minimal surface in $\R^3$ by
$$\mathbf{X}= \begin{bmatrix}
\operatorname{Re} \int_{\omega_0}^{\omega_ t}\mathbf{J}_1 d\omega\\
\operatorname{Re} \int_{\omega_0}^{\omega_ t} \mathbf{J}_2 d\omega\\
\operatorname{Re} \int_{\omega_0}^{\omega_ t} \mathbf{J}_3 d\omega
\end{bmatrix}$$
where $\omega_0 = 0$ for all minimal surfaces throughout this paper except for Costa's minimal surface where $\omega_0=(1+i)/2$.

== Embedded minimal surfaces and examples ==
The classical examples of embedded complete minimal surfaces in $\mathbb{R}^3$ with finite topology include the plane, the catenoid, the helicoid, and the Costa's minimal surface. Costa's surface involves Weierstrass's elliptic function $\wp$:
$$g(\omega)=\frac{A}{\wp' (\omega)}$$
$$f(\omega)= \wp(\omega)$$
where $A$ is a constant.

=== Helicatenoid ===
Choosing the functions $f(\omega) = e^{-i \alpha}e^{\omega/A}$ and $g(\omega) = e^{-\omega/A}$, a one parameter family of minimal surfaces is obtained.

$$\varphi_1 = e^{-i \alpha} \sinh\left(\frac{\omega}{A}\right)$$
$$\varphi_2 = i e^{-i \alpha} \cosh\left(\frac{\omega}{A}\right)$$
$$\varphi_3 = e^{-i \alpha}$$
$$\mathbf{X}(\omega)  =
\operatorname{Re}
\begin{bmatrix}
e^{-i\alpha} A \cosh \left( \frac{\omega}{A} \right)  \\
i e^{-i\alpha} A \sinh \left( \frac{\omega}{A} \right) \\
e^{-i\alpha} \omega \\
\end{bmatrix}
=
\cos(\alpha)
\begin{bmatrix}
A \cosh \left( \frac{\operatorname{Re}(\omega)}{A} \right) \cos \left( \frac{\operatorname{Im}(\omega)}{A} \right)\\
- A \cosh \left( \frac{\operatorname{Re}(\omega)}{A} \right) \sin \left( \frac{\operatorname{Im}(\omega)}{A} \right) \\
\operatorname{Re}(\omega) \\
\end{bmatrix} +
\sin(\alpha)
\begin{bmatrix}
A \sinh \left( \frac{\operatorname{Re}(\omega)}{A} \right) \sin \left( \frac{\operatorname{Im}(\omega)}{A} \right)\\
A \sinh \left( \frac{\operatorname{Re}(\omega)}{A} \right) \cos \left( \frac{\operatorname{Im}(\omega)}{A} \right) \\
\operatorname{Im}(\omega) \\
\end{bmatrix}$$

Choosing the parameters of the surface as $\omega = s + i(A \phi)$:
$$\mathbf{X}(s,\phi)=
\cos(\alpha)
\begin{bmatrix}
A \cosh \left( \frac{s}{A} \right) \cos \left( \phi \right)\\
- A \cosh \left( \frac{s}{A} \right) \sin \left( \phi \right) \\
s \\
\end{bmatrix} +
\sin(\alpha)
\begin{bmatrix}
A \sinh \left( \frac{s}{A} \right) \sin \left( \phi \right)\\
A \sinh \left( \frac{s}{A} \right) \cos \left( \phi \right) \\
A \phi \\
\end{bmatrix}$$

At the extremes, the surface is a catenoid $(\alpha = 0)$ or a helicoid $(\alpha = \pi/2)$. Otherwise, $\alpha$ represents a mixing angle. The resulting surface, with domain chosen to prevent self-intersection, is a catenary rotated around the $\mathbf{X}_3$ axis in a helical fashion.

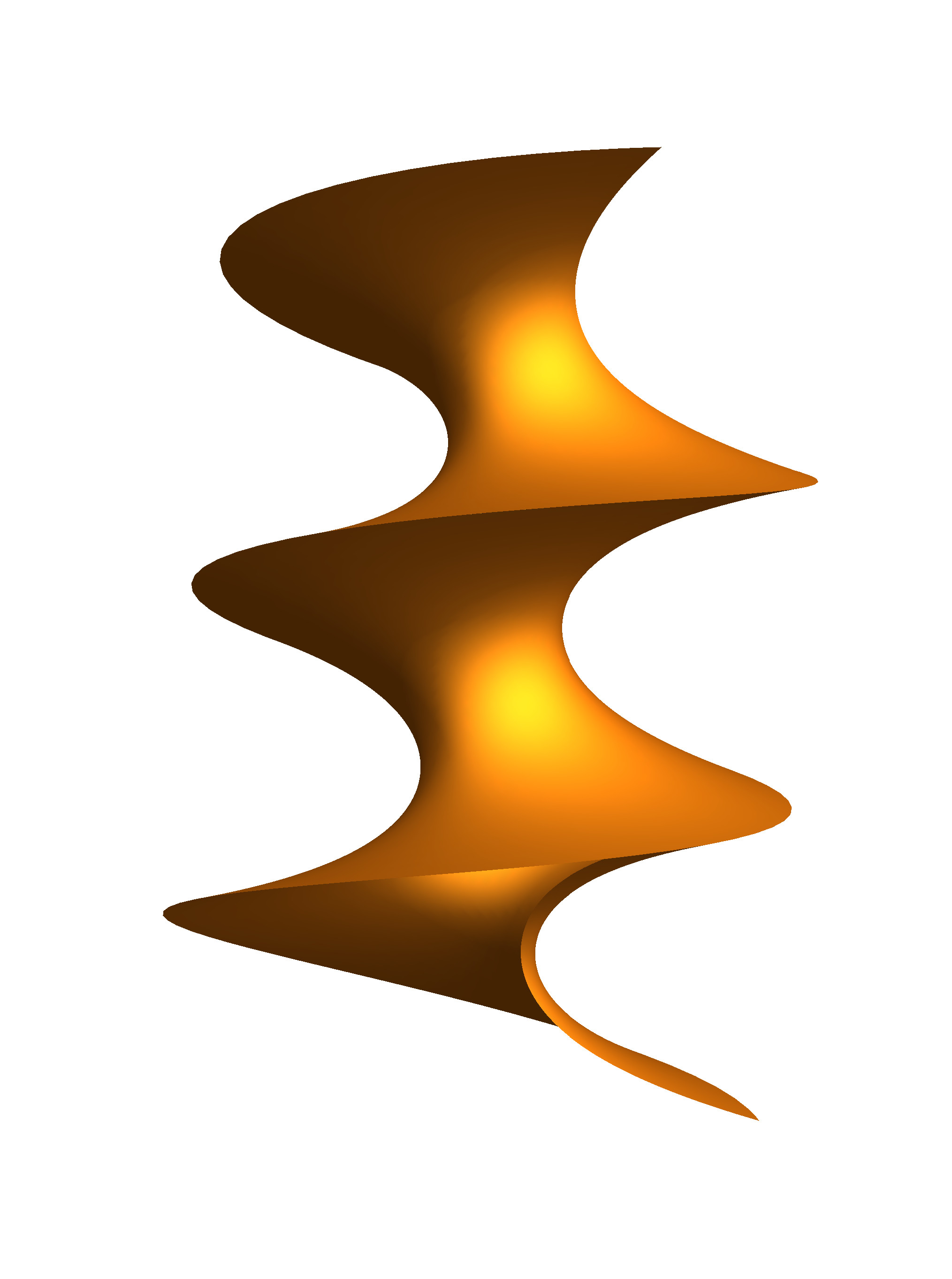
A catenary that spans periodic points on a helix, subsequently rotated along the helix to produce a minimal surface.

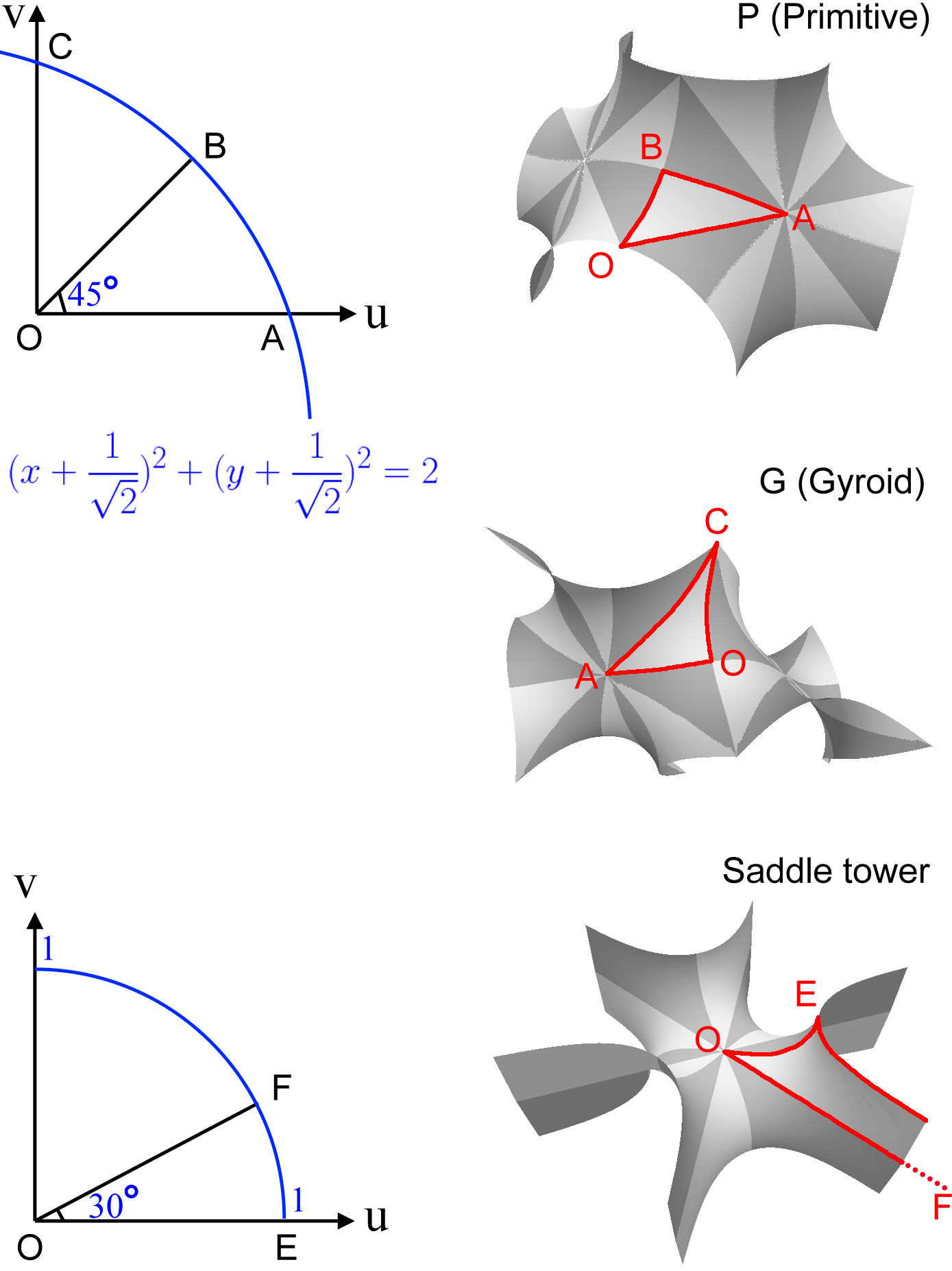
The fundamental domain (C) and the 3D surfaces. The continuous surfaces are made of copies of the fundamental patch (R3)

== Lines of curvature ==
One can rewrite each element of second fundamental matrix as a function of $f$ and $g$, for example
$$\mathbf{X_{uu}}  \cdot \mathbf{\hat{n}} =
\frac{1}{|g|^2+1}
\begin{bmatrix}
\operatorname{Re}  \left(  ( 1- g^2 ) f' - 2gfg'\right)  \\
\operatorname{Re}  \left( ( 1+ g^2 ) f'i+ 2gfg'i \right) \\
\operatorname{Re}  \left(  2gf' +2fg' \right) \\
\end{bmatrix}
\cdot
\begin{bmatrix}
\operatorname{Re} \left( 2g   \right) \\
\operatorname{Re} \left( -2gi   \right) \\
\operatorname{Re} \left( |g|^2-1   \right) \\
\end{bmatrix}
= -2\operatorname{Re} (fg')$$

And consequently the second fundamental form matrix can be simplified as
$$\begin{bmatrix}
-\operatorname{Re} f g'  & \;\;  \operatorname{Im} f g' \\
\operatorname{Im} f g'  & \;\;  \operatorname{Re} f g'
\end{bmatrix}$$

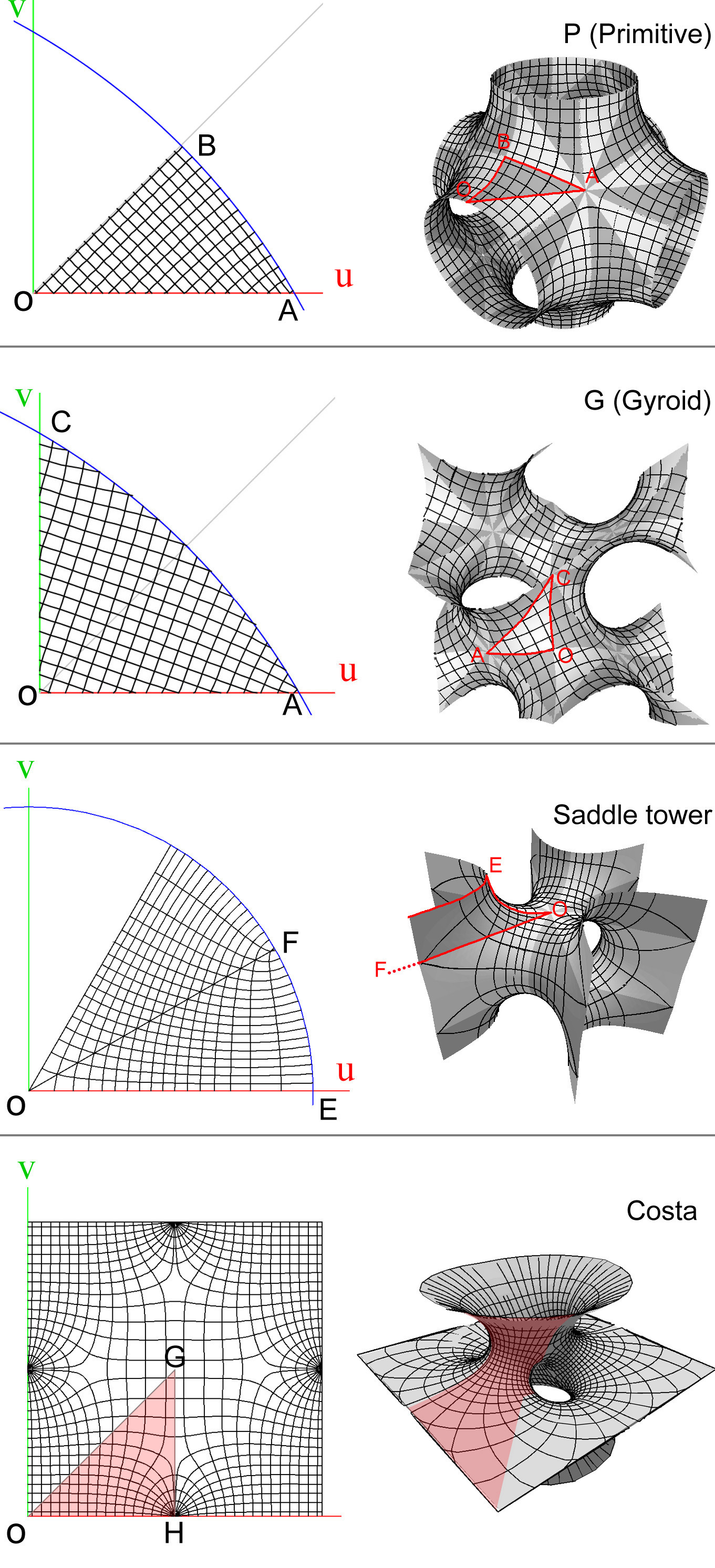
Lines of curvature make a quadrangulation of the domain

One of its eigenvectors is
$$\overline{\sqrt{ f g'} }$$
which represents the principal direction in the complex domain. Therefore, the two principal directions in the $uv$ space turn out to be
$$\phi = -\frac{1}{2} \operatorname{Arg}(f g') \pm k \pi /2$$

== See also ==
- Associate family
- Bryant surface, found by an analogous parameterization in hyperbolic space
