= Riemann's minimal surface =

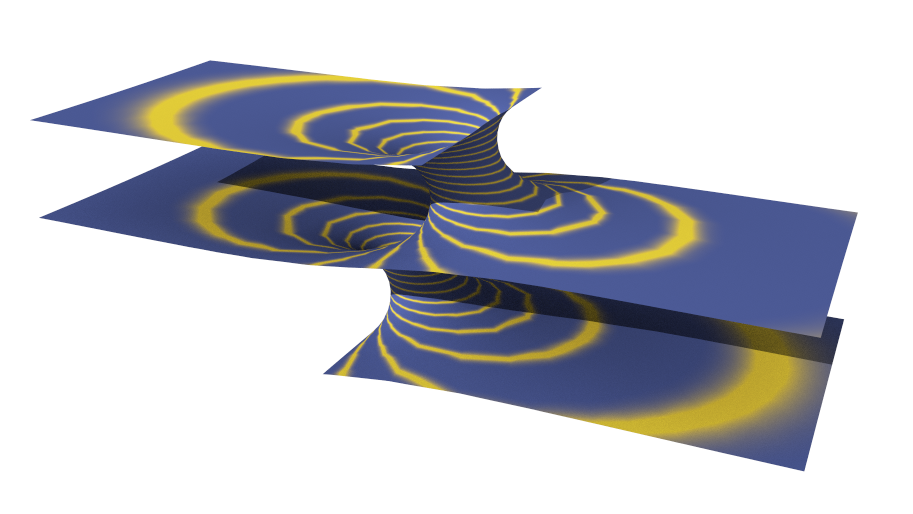
Section of Riemann's minimal surface.

In differential geometry, Riemann's minimal surface is a one-parameter family of minimal surfaces described by Bernhard Riemann in a posthumous paper published in 1867. Surfaces in the family are singly periodic minimal surfaces with an infinite number of ends asymptotic to parallel planes, each plane "shelf" connected with catenoid-like bridges to the neighbouring ones. Their intersections with horizontal planes are circles or lines; Riemann proved that they were the only minimal surfaces fibered by circles in parallel planes besides the catenoid, helicoid and plane. They are also the only nontrivial embedded minimal surfaces in Euclidean 3-space invariant under the group generated by a nontrivial translation. It is possible to attach extra handles to the surfaces, producing higher-genus minimal surface families.
