= Mean curvature =

Differential geometry measure

In mathematics, the mean curvature $H$ of a surface $S$ is an extrinsic measure of curvature that comes from differential geometry and that locally describes the curvature of an embedded surface in some ambient space such as Euclidean space.

The concept was used by Sophie Germain in her work on elasticity theory, published 1831. Jean Baptiste Marie Meusnier used it in 1776, in his studies of minimal surfaces. It is important in the analysis of minimal surfaces, which have mean curvature zero, and in the analysis of physical interfaces between fluids (such as soap films) which, for example, have constant mean curvature in static flows, by the Young–Laplace equation.

== Definition ==
Let $p$ be a point on the surface $S$ inside the three dimensional Euclidean space R^{3}. Each plane through $p$ containing the normal line to $S$ cuts $S$ in a (plane) curve. Fixing a choice of unit normal gives a signed curvature to that curve. As the plane is rotated by an angle $\theta$ (always containing the normal line) that curvature can vary. The maximal curvature $\kappa_1$ and minimal curvature $\kappa_2$ are known as the principal curvatures of $S$.

The mean curvature at $p\in S$ is then the average of the signed curvature over all angles $\theta$:

$$H = \frac{1}{2\pi}\int_0^{2\pi} \kappa(\theta) \;d\theta$$.

By applying Euler's theorem, this is equal to the average of the principal curvatures (Spivak 1999, Volume 3, Chapter 2):

$$H = {1 \over 2} (\kappa_1 + \kappa_2).$$

More generally (Spivak 1999, Volume 4, Chapter 7), for a hypersurface $T$ the mean curvature is given as

$$H=\frac{1}{n}\sum_{i=1}^{n} \kappa_{i}.$$

More abstractly, the mean curvature is the trace of the second fundamental form divided by n (or equivalently, the shape operator).

Additionally, the mean curvature $H$ may be written in terms of the covariant derivative $\nabla$ as

$$H\vec{n} = g^{ij}\nabla_i\nabla_j X,$$

using the Gauss-Weingarten relations, where $X(x)$ is a smoothly embedded hypersurface, $\vec{n}$ a unit normal vector, and $g_{ij}$ the metric tensor.

A surface is a minimal surface if and only if the mean curvature is zero. Furthermore, a surface which evolves under the mean curvature of the surface $S$, is said to obey a heat-type equation called the mean curvature flow equation.

The sphere is the only embedded surface of constant positive mean curvature without boundary or singularities. However, the result is not true when the condition "embedded surface" is weakened to "immersed surface".

=== Surfaces in 3D space ===
For a surface defined in 3D space, the mean curvature is related to the divergence of a unit normal of the surface:

$$2 H = -\nabla \cdot \hat n$$

where the sign of the curvature depends on the choice of normal (inward or outward): the curvature is positive if the surface curves "towards" the normal. The formula above holds for surfaces in 3D space defined in any manner, as long as the divergence of the unit normal may be calculated.

Mean curvature may also be calculated as

$$2 H = \text{Trace}((\mathrm{II})(\mathrm{I}^{-1}))$$

where I and II denote first and second fundamental forms, respectively.

If $S(x,y)$ is a parametrization of the surface and $u, v$ are two linearly independent vectors in parameter space then the mean curvature can be written in terms of the first and second quadratic form matrices as
$$\frac{l G-2 m F + n E}{2 ( E G - F^2)}$$
where $E = \mathrm{I}(u,u)$, $F = \mathrm{I}(u,v)$, $G = \mathrm{I}(v,v)$, $l = \mathrm{II}(u,u)$, $m = \mathrm{II}(u,v)$, $n = \mathrm{II}(v,v)$.

For the special case of a surface defined as a function of two coordinates (a bivariate function), e.g. $z = S(x, y)$, and using the upward pointing normal, the (doubled) mean curvature expression is

$$\begin{align}
2 H & = -\nabla \cdot \left(\frac{\nabla(z-S)}{|\nabla(z - S)|}\right) \\
& = \nabla \cdot \left(\frac{\nabla S-\nabla z}
{\sqrt{1 + |\nabla S|^2}}\right) \\
& =
\frac{
\left(1 + \left(\frac{\partial S}{\partial x}\right)^2\right) \frac{\partial^2 S}{\partial y^2} -
2 \frac{\partial S}{\partial x} \frac{\partial S}{\partial y} \frac{\partial^2 S}{\partial x \partial y} +
\left(1 + \left(\frac{\partial S}{\partial y}\right)^2\right) \frac{\partial^2 S}{\partial x^2}
}{\left(1 + \left(\frac{\partial S}{\partial x}\right)^2 + \left(\frac{\partial S}{\partial y}\right)^2\right)^{3/2}}.
\end{align}$$

In particular at a point where $\nabla S=0$, the mean curvature is half the trace of the Hessian matrix of $S$.

If the surface is additionally known to be axisymmetric with $z = S(r)$,

$$2 H = \frac{\partial^2 S}{\partial r^2} \frac{1}{\left(1 + \left(\frac{\partial S}{\partial r}\right)^2\right)^{3/2}} + \frac{1}{r}{\frac{\partial S}{\partial r}}\frac{1}{\left(1 + \left(\frac{\partial S}{\partial r}\right)^2\right)^{1/2}},$$

where $\frac{1}{r} {\frac{\partial S}{\partial r}}$ comes from the derivative of $z = S(r) = S\left(\sqrt{x^2 + y^2} \right)$.

=== Implicit form of mean curvature ===
The mean curvature of a surface specified by an equation $F(x,y,z)=0$ can be calculated by using the gradient $\nabla F=\left( \frac{\partial F}{\partial x}, \frac{\partial F}{\partial y}, \frac{\partial F}{\partial z} \right)$ and the Hessian matrix

$$\textstyle \mbox{Hess}(F)=
\begin{pmatrix}
\frac{\partial^2 F}{\partial x^2} & \frac{\partial^2 F}{\partial x\partial y} & \frac{\partial^2 F}{\partial x\partial z} \\
\frac{\partial^2 F}{\partial y\partial x} & \frac{\partial^2 F}{\partial y^2} & \frac{\partial^2 F}{\partial y\partial z}  \\
\frac{\partial^2 F}{\partial z\partial x} & \frac{\partial^2 F}{\partial z\partial y} & \frac{\partial^2 F}{\partial z^2}
\end{pmatrix}
.$$

The mean curvature is given by:

$$H = \frac{ \nabla F\  \mbox{Hess}(F) \ \nabla F^{\mathsf {T}} - |\nabla F|^2\, \text{Trace}(\mbox{Hess}(F)) } { 2|\nabla F|^3 }$$

Another form is as the divergence of the unit normal. A unit normal is given by $\frac{\nabla F}{|\nabla F|}$ and the mean curvature is

$$H = -{\frac{1}{2}}\nabla\cdot \left(\frac{\nabla F}{|\nabla F|}\right).$$

== In fluid mechanics ==
An alternate definition is occasionally used in fluid mechanics to avoid factors of two:

$$H_f = (\kappa_1 + \kappa_2) \,$$.

This results in the pressure according to the Young–Laplace equation inside an equilibrium spherical droplet being surface tension times $H_f$; the two curvatures are equal to the reciprocal of the droplet's radius

$$\kappa_1 = \kappa_2 = r^{-1} \,$$.

== Minimal surfaces ==
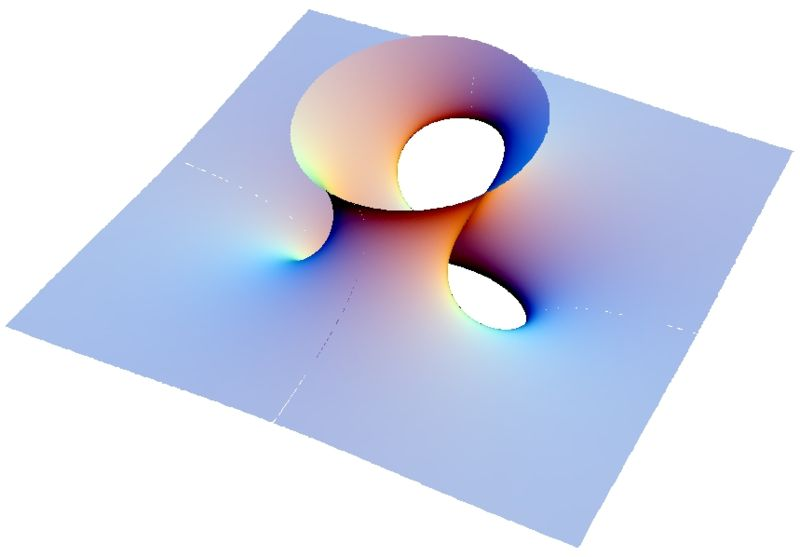
A rendering of Costa's minimal surface.

A minimal surface is a surface which has zero mean curvature at all points. Classic examples include the catenoid, helicoid and Enneper surface. Recent discoveries include Costa's minimal surface and the Gyroid.

=== CMC surfaces ===
An extension of the idea of a minimal surface are surfaces of constant mean curvature. The surfaces of unit constant mean curvature in hyperbolic space are called Bryant surfaces.

== See also ==
- Gaussian curvature
- Mean curvature flow
- Inverse mean curvature flow
- First variation of area formula
- Stretched grid method
