= First variation of area formula =

Element in Riemannian geometry

In the mathematical field of Riemannian geometry, every submanifold of a Riemannian manifold has a surface area. The first variation of area formula is a fundamental computation for how this quantity is affected by the deformation of the submanifold. The fundamental quantity is to do with the mean curvature.

Let (M, g) denote a Riemannian manifold, and consider an oriented smooth manifold S (possibly with boundary) together with a one-parameter family of smooth immersions f_{t} of S into M. For each individual value of the parameter t, the immersion f_{t} induces a Riemannian metric on S, which itself induces a differential form on S known as the Riemannian volume form ω_{t}. The first variation of area refers to the computation

$$\frac{d}{dt}\omega_t=-\left\langle W_t,H(f_t)\right\rangle_g\omega_t+\text{d}\left(\iota_{W_t^\parallel}\omega_t\right)$$

in which H(f_{t}) is the mean curvature vector of the immersion f_{t} and W_{t} denotes the variation vector field $\frac{\partial}{\partial t}f_t.$ Both of these quantities are vector fields along the map f_{t}. The second term in the formula represents the exterior derivative of the interior product of the volume form with the vector field $W_t^\parallel$ on S, defined as the tangential projection of W_{t}. Via Cartan's magic formula, this term can also be written as the Lie derivative of the volume form relative to the tangential projection. As such, this term vanishes if each f_{t} is reparametrized by the corresponding one-parameter family of diffeomorphisms of S.

Both sides of the first variation formula can be integrated over S, provided that the variation vector field has compact support. In that case it is immediate from Stokes' theorem that

$$\frac{d}{dt}\operatorname{vol}(f_t)=-\int_S \left\langle W_t,H(f_t)\right\rangle_g\omega_t+\int_{\partial S}\iota_{W_t^\parallel}\omega_t.$$

In many contexts, S is a closed manifold or the variation vector field is every orthogonal to the submanifold. In either case, the second term automatically vanishes. In such a situation, the mean curvature vector is seen as entirely governing how the surface area of a submanifold is modified by a deformation of the surface. In particular, the vanishing of the mean curvature vector is seen as being equivalent to submanifold being a critical point of the volume functional. This shows how a minimal submanifold can be characterized either by the critical point theory of the volume functional or by an explicit partial differential equation for the immersion.

The special case of the first variation formula arising when S is an interval on the real number line is particularly well-known. In this context, the volume functional is known as the length functional and its variational analysis is fundamental to the study of geodesics in Riemannian geometry.
