= Robert Longhurst =

American sculptor

- Born: Schenectady, New York, United States
- Education: Kent State University
- Occupation: Painter

Robert Longhurst is an American sculptor who was born in Schenectady, New York, in 1949. At an early age he was fascinated by his father's small figurative woodcarvings.

Longhurst received a Bachelor of Architecture from Kent State University in 1975. He began his artistic career in 1976 in Cincinnati, Ohio. His first commissioned works were three figurative sculptures in black walnut for Cincinnati businessman Joe David who owned Midwest Woodworking company. In 1978 Longhurst completed a life size figure in pine of an Adirondack hermit, Noah John Rondeau for the Adirondack Museum in Blue Mountain Lake, New York.

Although Longhurst's career began with figurative works, it soon evolved into non-representational abstraction in exotic woods, marble and granite that draws on his background in Architecture. Many of his pieces are defined as being at the intersection of where the fields of art and math overlap, and they have been discussed by mathematicians such as Nathaniel Friedman, Reuben Hersh, and Ivars Peterson. Some of his sculptures portray minimal surfaces, which were named after German geometer Alfred Enneper. Nathaniel Friedman writes, "The surfaces [of Longhurst's sculptures] generally have appealing sections with negative curvature (saddle surfaces). This is a natural intuitive result of Longhurst's feeling for satisfying shape rather than a mathematically deduced result."

Longhurst participated in the International Snow Sculpture Championships in Breckenridge, Colorado, in 2000 and 2001, by joining a snow sculpting team from Minnesota. Two of his sculptures representing minimal surfaces were enlarged and carved from blocks of snow measuring 12' high x 10' wide x 10' deep. In the 2000 championships, the team received second place, Artists' Choice Award, and People's Choice Award.

Robert Longhurst lives in Chestertown, New York.

== Selected collections ==
Arabesque XXXI carved in bubinga wood by Robert Longhurst, c. 2007, University of Michigan

- Adirondack Museum - Blue Mountain Lake, New York
- American Financial Corporation - Cincinnati, Ohio
- Amoco Corporation - Chicago, Illinois
- ANA (All Nippon Airways) Hotel - Tokyo, Japan
- AT&T - Chicago, Illinois
- Bank of Tokyo - New York, New York
- Bastion Industries - New York, New York
- BMC Software - Houston, Texas
- Bohlke Veneer Corporation - Fairfield, Ohio
- Brown-Forman Corporation - Louisville, Kentucky
- Burlington Northern Railroad - Fort Worth, Texas
- Champlin Oil Corporation - Fort Worth, Texas
- Chester B. Stem Incorporated - New Albany, Indiana
- Cornerstone Holdings Corporation - Aspen, Colorado
- Crown Associates Realty Incorporated - Beverly Hills, California
- Dana–Farber Cancer Institute – Boston, Massachusetts
- Danis Industries - Dayton, Ohio
- Duke University - Durham, North Carolina
- Empire Capital Corporation - Southport, Connecticut
- Ensign-Bickford Industries - Simsbury, Connecticut
- Fuqua Industries - Atlanta, Georgia
- Ideal Textile Company - Los Angeles, California
- International Woodworking Fair - Norcross, Georgia
- Gary Kaplan & Associates - Los Angeles, California
- Kimball International - Jasper, Indiana
- Louisville Courier Journal & Times - Louisville, Kentucky
- Midwest Woodworking Company - Cincinnati, Ohio
- Museum of Arts and Design - New York, New York
- National City Bank - Marion, Ohio
- National Reinsurance Corporation - Stamford, Connecticut
- Northern Natural Gas Company - Omaha, Nebraska
- Norton Simon Collection - New York, New York
- Prime Holding Company - Austin, Texas
- Royal Caribbean Cruise Lines - Oslo, Norway
- Seamless Technologies Incorporated - Morristown, New Jersey
- Seemac Incorporated - Carmel, Indiana
- Seven Bridges Foundation - Greenwich, CT
- Shipman Goodwin - Hartford, Connecticut
- Smithsonian American Art Museum - Washington, D.C.
- Southwest Psychiatric Associates - Torrance, California
- Sperry Corporation - New York, New York
- Takasago International Corporation - Rockleigh, New Jersey
- Corning Tropel Corp. - Fairport, New York
- Valley National Bank - McAllen, Texas
- University of Michigan - Ann Arbor, Michigan
- Victor Wire & Cable - Los Angeles, California
- Wigand Corporation - Dallas, Texas
