= Simons cone =

Geometric minimal hypersurface

In geometry and geometric measure theory, the Simons cone refers to a specific minimal hypersurface in $\mathbb R^8$ that plays a role in resolving Bernstein's problem in higher dimensions. It is named after American mathematician Jim Simons.

== Definition ==
The Simons cone is defined as the hypersurface given by the equation

$$S = \{x \in \mathbb R^8 | x_1^2 + x_2^2 + x_3^2 + x_4^2 = x_5^2 + x_6^2 + x_7^2 + x_8^2 \} \subset \mathbb R^8$$.

This 7-dimensional cone has the distinctive property that its mean curvature vanishes at every point except at the origin, where the cone has a singularity.

== Applications ==
The classical Bernstein theorem states that any minimal graph in $\mathbb R^3$ must be a plane. This was extended to $\mathbb R^4$ by Wendell Fleming in 1962 and Ennio De Giorgi in 1965, and to dimensions up to $\mathbb R^5$ by Frederick J. Almgren Jr. in 1966 and to $\mathbb R^8$ by Jim Simons in 1968. The existence of the Simons cone as a minimizing cone in $\mathbb R^8$ showed that the Bernstein theorem could not be extended to $\mathbb R^9$ and higher dimensions. In 1969, Bombieri, De Giorgi, and Enrico Giusti proved that the Simons cone is area-minimizing, disproving the Bernstein conjecture for higher dimensions.

== Original source ==
- J. Simons (1968), "Minimal varieties in riemannian manifolds" Annals of Mathematics, 88 pp. 62-105
