= Schoen–Yau conjecture =

In mathematics, the Schoen–Yau conjecture is a disproved conjecture in hyperbolic geometry, named after the mathematicians Richard Schoen and Shing-Tung Yau.

It was inspired by a theorem of Erhard Heinz (1952). One method of disproof is the use of Scherk surfaces, as used by Harold Rosenberg and Pascal Collin (2006).

== Setting and statement of the conjecture ==
Let $\mathbb{C}$ be the complex plane considered as a Riemannian manifold with its usual (flat) Riemannian metric. Let $\mathbb{H}$ denote the hyperbolic plane, i.e. the unit disc

$$\mathbb{H} := \{ (x, y) \in \mathbb{R}^2 | x^2 + y^2 < 1 \}$$

endowed with the hyperbolic metric

$$\mathrm{d}s^2 = 4 \frac{\mathrm{d} x^2 + \mathrm{d} y^2}{(1 - (x^2 + y^2))^2}.$$

E. Heinz proved in 1952 that there can exist no harmonic diffeomorphism

$$f : \mathbb{H} \to \mathbb{C}. \,$$

In light of this theorem, Schoen conjectured that there exists no harmonic diffeomorphism

$$g : \mathbb{C} \to \mathbb{H}. \,$$

(It is not clear how Yau's name became associated with the conjecture: in unpublished correspondence with Harold Rosenberg, both Schoen and Yau identify Schoen as having postulated the conjecture). The Schoen(-Yau) conjecture has since been disproved.

== Comments ==
The emphasis is on the existence or non-existence of an harmonic diffeomorphism, and that this property is a "one-way" property. In more detail: suppose that we consider two Riemannian manifolds M and N (with their respective metrics), and write

$$M \sim N\,$$

if there exists a diffeomorphism from M onto N (in the usual terminology, M and N are diffeomorphic). Write

$$M \propto N$$

if there exists an harmonic diffeomorphism from M onto N. It is not difficult to show that $\sim$ (being diffeomorphic) is an equivalence relation on the objects of the category of Riemannian manifolds. In particular, $\sim$ is a symmetric relation:

$$M \sim N \iff N \sim M.$$

It can be shown that the hyperbolic plane and (flat) complex plane are indeed diffeomorphic:

$$\mathbb{H} \sim \mathbb{C},$$

so the question is whether or not they are "harmonically diffeomorphic". However, as the truth of Heinz's theorem and the falsity of the Schoen–Yau conjecture demonstrate, $\propto$ is not a symmetric relation:

$$\mathbb{C} \propto \mathbb{H} \text{ but } \mathbb{H} \not \propto \mathbb{C}.$$

Thus, being "harmonically diffeomorphic" is a much stronger property than simply being diffeomorphic, and can be a "one-way" relation.
