= Noah John Rondeau =

American hermit (1883–1967)

Noah John Rondeau (July 6, 1883 – August 24, 1967) was an American hermit in the High Peaks of the Adirondack Mountains of New York State.

== Biography ==
=== Early life ===
Rondeau was born on July 6, 1883, and raised near Au Sable Forks, New York. He grew up there with his many siblings and his parents Peter Rondeau (b. Canada) and Alice "Allie" Corrow Rondeau (b. New York, d. May 1900, Black Brook, New York), but he ran away from home as a teenager several months after the death of his mother. Because of his departure, Rondeau only obtained an eighth-grade education yet was quite well read, with a strong interest in astronomy. Before distancing himself too far from civilization, he lived in Coreys, New York, on the Raquette River in the western Adirondacks, where for fifteen years he worked as a handyman, caretaker, and guide. He gained some of his knowledge of the woods from Dan Emmett, an Abenaki Indian from Canada. He also made occasional brief visits to jail for game law violations.

=== Isolation ===
Rondeau frequently hunted and trapped in the Cold River area, about 17 miles from Corey's, and in 1929, at age 46, he began living alone year-round in the remote area, saying he was "not well satisfied with the world and its trends," and calling himself the "Mayor of Cold River City (Population 1)."

During this period of over several decades, Rondeau kept extensive journals, many of which were written in letter-substitution ciphers of his own invention. The ciphers progressed through at least three major revisions in the late thirties and early forties, and in their final form they resisted all efforts to be deciphered until 1992 (Life With Noah, p. 91).

Although he was considered an Adirondack hermit, he normally accepted visitors to his hermitage and even performed for them on his violin. Rondeau, 5'2", built himself two cabins and several wigwams, which later provided firewood, and he lived primarily on trout, local game, and greens. His final cabin is on exhibit at the Adirondack Experience: The Museum on Blue Mountain Lake, in Blue Mountain Lake, NY, where there is also a recording of Rondeau speaking about "them wonderful mountains." He was known to have said that "Man is forever a stranger and alone," as well as what he liked best about crowds was, "going the other way."

During World War II, in his sixties, Rondeau was apparently suspected of being a draft dodger, as he submitted a letter dated 4/8/43 to the Ausable Forks Record-Post:

I never went to Cold River to dodge anything, unless it was from 1930 to 1940 when it might be said I dodged the American labor failure at which time I could not get enough in civilization to get along even as well as I could at Cold River under hard circumstances in the back woods. Since I'm not evading I did not make my first appearance at Cold River on the day that Pearl Harbor was bombed. What I'm doing toward the war effort looks like nothing, but that's all I can do and I'm doing it and it is this -- I'm self sustained.

=== Later life ===
In 1947, Rondeau was flown to the National Sportsmen's Show in New York City by helicopter, starting a series of appearances at similar shows throughout the country.

In 1950, the New York State Conservation Department closed the Cold River area to the public after a hurricane leveled the forest, forcing Rondeau from his home at age 67. He then lived around Lake Placid, Saranac Lake, and Wilmington, New York. Besides the sportsmen's shows, he worked for a time at Frontiertown and at the North Pole in Wilmington as a substitute Santa Claus. He did not return to a hermit's life and eventually went on welfare. He was buried in North Elba Cemetery, near Lake Placid, with a stone from his Cold River home marking his grave.

== Legacy ==
The Adirondack Experience has materials concerning Rondeau, including his life size sculpture carved by Robert Longhurst, in its collections.
