= Bryant surface =

In Riemannian geometry, a Bryant surface is a 2-dimensional surface embedded in 3-dimensional hyperbolic space with constant mean curvature equal to 1. These surfaces take their name from the geometer Robert Bryant, who proved that every simply-connected minimal surface in 3-dimensional Euclidean space is isometric to a Bryant surface by a holomorphic parameterization analogous to the (Euclidean) Weierstrass–Enneper parameterization.
