= On the Number of Primes Less Than a Given Magnitude =

1859 mathematics paper by Bernhard Riemann

The article

"Ueber die Anzahl der Primzahlen unter einer gegebenen Grösse" (usual English translation: "On the Number of Primes Less Than a Given Magnitude") is a seminal 9-page paper by Bernhard Riemann published in the November 1859 edition of the Monatsberichte der Königlich Preußischen Akademie der Wissenschaften zu Berlin.

== Overview ==
This paper studies the prime-counting function using analytic methods. Although it is the only paper Riemann ever published on number theory, it contains ideas which influenced thousands of researchers during the late 19th century and up to the present day. The paper consists primarily of definitions, heuristic arguments, sketches of proofs, and the application of powerful analytic methods; all of these have become essential concepts and tools of modern analytic number theory.

Among the new definitions, ideas, and notation introduced:

- The use of the Greek letter zeta (ζ) for a function previously mentioned by Euler
- The analytic continuation of this zeta function ζ(s) to all complex s ≠ 1
- The entire function ξ(s), related to the zeta function through the gamma function (or the Π function, in Riemann's usage)
- The discrete function J(x) defined for x ≥ 0, which is defined by J(0) = 0 and J(x) jumps by 1/n at each prime power p^{n}. (Riemann calls this function f(x).)

Among the proofs and sketches of proofs:

- Proof of the Hankel contour representation of the zeta function
- Two proofs of the functional equation of ζ(s)
- Proof sketch of the product representation of ξ(s)
- Proof sketch of the approximation of the number of roots of ξ(s) whose imaginary parts lie between 0 and T.

Among the conjectures made:

- The Riemann hypothesis, that all (nontrivial) zeros of ζ(s) have real part $\textstyle\frac{1}{2}$. Riemann states this in terms of the roots of the related ξ function,
  ... es ist sehr wahrscheinlich, dass alle Wurzeln reell sind. Hiervon wäre allerdings ein strenger Beweis zu wünschen; ich habe indess die Aufsuchung desselben nach einigen flüchtigen vergeblichen Versuchen vorläufig bei Seite gelassen, da er für den nächsten Zweck meiner Untersuchung entbehrlich schien.
  That is,
  it is very probable that all roots are real. One would, however, wish for a strict proof of this; I have, though, after some fleeting futile attempts, provisionally put aside the search for such, as it appears unnecessary for the next objective of my investigation.
  (He was discussing a version of the zeta function, modified so that its roots are real rather than on the critical line.)

New methods and techniques used in number theory:

- Functional equations arising from automorphic forms
- Analytic continuation (although not in the spirit of Weierstrass)
- Contour integration
- Fourier inversion.

Riemann also discussed the relationship between ζ(s) and the distribution of the prime numbers, using the function J(x) essentially as a measure for Stieltjes integration. He then obtained the main result of the paper, a formula for J(x), by comparing with ln(ζ(s)). Riemann then found a formula for the prime-counting function π(x) (which he calls F(x)). He notes that his equation explains the fact that π(x) grows more slowly than the logarithmic integral, as had been found by Carl Friedrich Gauss and Carl Wolfgang Benjamin Goldschmidt.

The paper contains some peculiarities for modern readers, such as the use of Π(s − 1) instead of Γ(s), writing tt instead of t^{2}, and using the bounds of ∞ to ∞ as to denote the Hankel contour.
