= Carl Wolfgang Benjamin Goldschmidt =

German astronomer, mathematician, and physicist

Carl Wolfgang Benjamin Goldschmidt (4 August 1807 – 15 February 1851) was a German astronomer, mathematician, and physicist of Jewish descent who was a professor of astronomy at the University of Göttingen.

== Mathematical works ==
A student of Carl Friedrich Gauss and an assistant to Gauss at the university observatory, Goldschmidt frequently collaborated with Gauss on various mathematical and scientific works. Goldschmidt was in turn a professor of Gauss's protégé Bernhard Riemann. Data gathered by Gauss and Goldschmidt on the growth of the logarithmic integral compared to the distribution of prime numbers was cited by Riemann in "On the Number of Primes Less Than a Given Magnitude", Riemann's seminal paper on the prime-counting function.

In 1831, Goldschmidt wrote a mathematical treatise in Latin, "Determinatio superficiei minimae rotatione curvae data duo puncta jungentis circa datum axem ortae" ("Determination of the surface-minimal rotation curve given two joined points about a given axis of origin"). The paper dealt with the problem in the calculus of variations of determining the minimal surface of revolution, the surface of revolution of the planar curve between two given points which minimizes surface area. Solutions to the problem exist which are not continuous; such discontinuous solutions are known as Goldschmidt solutions in honor of Goldschmidt's discovery of them.

== Physics works ==
In 1834, Goldschmidt co-authored, in German, the textbook Lehrbuch der analytischen Optik (Textbook of Analytical Optics) with J. C. Eduard Schmidt. Together with Gauss and Wilhelm Eduard Weber, Goldschmidt published in 1840 Atlas des Erdmagnetismus: nach den Elementen der Theorie entworfen (Atlas of Geomagnetism: According to the Elements of the Theory of Design), a series of magnetic maps. In 1845, Goldschmidt published, also in German, a book on electromagnetism, Untersuchungen über die magnetische Declination in Göttingen (Studies of the Magnetic Declination in Göttingen).

== Personal life ==
Goldschmidt, who suffered from an enlargement of the heart, died in his sleep and was found on the morning of 15 February 1851.
