= Enneper surface =

Minimal surface

A portion of the Enneper surface

In differential geometry and algebraic geometry, the Enneper surface is a self-intersecting surface that can be described parametrically by:
$$\begin{align}
x &= \tfrac{1}{3} u \left(1 - \tfrac{1}{3}u^2 + v^2\right), \\
y &= \tfrac{1}{3} v \left(1 - \tfrac{1}{3}v^2 + u^2\right), \\
z & = \tfrac{1}{3} \left(u^2 - v^2\right). \end{align}$$

It was introduced by Alfred Enneper in 1864 in connection with minimal surface theory.

The Weierstrass–Enneper parameterization is very simple, $f(z)=1, g(z)=z$, and the real parametric form can easily be calculated from it. The surface is conjugate to itself.

Implicitization methods of algebraic geometry can be used to find out that the points in the Enneper surface given above satisfy the degree-9 polynomial equation
$$\begin{align}
& 64 z^9 - 128 z^7 + 64 z^5 - 702 x^2 y^2 z^3 - 18 x^2 y^2 z + 144 (y^2 z^6 - x^2 z^6)\\
& {} + 162 (y^4 z^2 - x^4 z^2) + 27 (y^6 - x^6) + 9 (x^4 z + y^4 z) + 48 (x^2 z^3 + y^2 z^3)\\
& {} - 432 (x^2 z^5 + y^2 z^5) + 81 (x^4 y^2 - x^2 y^4) + 240 (y^2 z^4 - x^2 z^4) - 135 (x^4 z^3 + y^4 z^3) = 0.
\end{align}$$

Dually, the tangent plane at the point with given parameters is $a + b x + c y + d z = 0,\$ where
$$\begin{align}
a &= -\left(u^2 - v^2\right) \left(1 + \tfrac{1}{3}u^2 + \tfrac{1}{3}v^2\right), \\
b &= 6 u, \\
c &= 6 v, \\
d &= -3\left(1 - u^2 - v^2\right).
\end{align}$$
Its coefficients satisfy the implicit degree-6 polynomial equation
$$\begin{align}
&162 a^2 b^2 c^2 + 6 b^2 c^2 d^2 - 4 (b^6 + c^6) + 54 (a b^4 d - a c^4 d) + 81 (a^2 b^4 + a^2 c^4)\\
&{} + 4 (b^4 c^2 + b^2 c^4) - 3 (b^4 d^2 + c^4 d^2) + 36 (a b^2 d^3 - a c^2 d^3) = 0.
\end{align}$$

The Jacobian, Gaussian curvature and mean curvature are
$$\begin{align}
J &= \frac{1}{81}(1 + u^2 + v^2)^4, \\
K &= -\frac{4}{9}\frac{1}{J}, \\
H &= 0.
\end{align}$$
The total curvature is $-4\pi$. Osserman proved that a complete minimal surface in $\R^3$ with total curvature $-4\pi$ is either the catenoid or the Enneper surface.

The curves obtained by setting $u=0$ or $v=0$ are geodesics of the Enneper surface, and are copies of the Tschirnhausen cubic.

Another property is that all bicubical minimal Bézier surfaces are, up to an affine transformation, pieces of the surface.

It can be generalized to higher order rotational symmetries by using the Weierstrass–Enneper parameterization $f(z) = 1, g(z) = z^k$ for integer k>1. It can also be generalized to higher dimensions; Enneper-like surfaces are known to exist in $\R^n$ for n up to 7.

See also for higher order algebraic Enneper surfaces.
