= Associate family =

Animation showing the deformation of a helicoid into a catenoid as θ changes.

In differential geometry, the associate family (or Bonnet family) of a minimal surface is a one-parameter family of minimal surfaces which share the same Weierstrass data. That is, if the surface has the representation

$$x_k(\zeta) = \Re \left\{ \int_{0}^{\zeta} \varphi_{k}(z) \, dz \right\} + c_k , \qquad k=1,2,3$$

the family is described by

$$x_k(\zeta,\theta) = \Re \left\{ e^{i \theta} \int_0^\zeta \varphi_{k}(z) \, dz \right\} + c_k , \qquad \theta \in [0,2\pi]$$

where $\Re$ indicates the real part of a complex number.

For θ = π/2 the surface is called the conjugate of the θ = 0 surface.

The transformation can be viewed as locally rotating the principal curvature directions. The surface normals of a point with a fixed ζ remains unchanged as θ changes; the point itself moves along an ellipse.

Some examples of associate surface families are: the catenoid and helicoid family, the Schwarz P, Schwarz D and gyroid family, and the Scherk's first and second surface family. The Enneper surface is conjugate to itself: it is left invariant as θ changes.

Conjugate surfaces have the property that any straight line on a surface maps to a planar geodesic on its conjugate surface and vice versa. If a patch of one surface is bounded by a straight line, then the conjugate patch is bounded by a planar symmetry line. This is useful for constructing minimal surfaces by going to the conjugate space: being bound by planes is equivalent to being bound by a polygon.

There are counterparts to the associate families of minimal surfaces in higher-dimensional spaces and manifolds.
