= Heinrich Scherk =

German mathematician

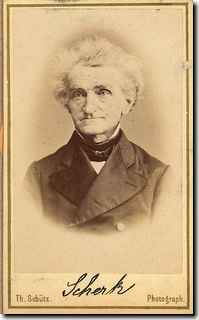
- Heinrich Ferdinand Scherk
- Born: 27 October 1798; Posen, Kingdom of Prussia
- Died: 4 October 1885 (aged 86); Bremen, German Empire
- Education: Universität Berlin
- Known for: Distribution of prime numbers Scherk surface
- Scientific career
- Fields: Mathematics
- Workplaces: Universität Halle-Wittenberg; Universität zu Kiel
- Doctoral advisor: Friedrich Bessel; Heinrich Wilhelm Brandes
- Doctoral students: Ernst Kummer

Heinrich Ferdinand Scherk (27 October 1798 – 4 October 1885) was a German mathematician notable for his work on minimal surfaces and the distribution of prime numbers. He is also notable as the doctoral advisor of Ernst Kummer.
