= Saddle tower =

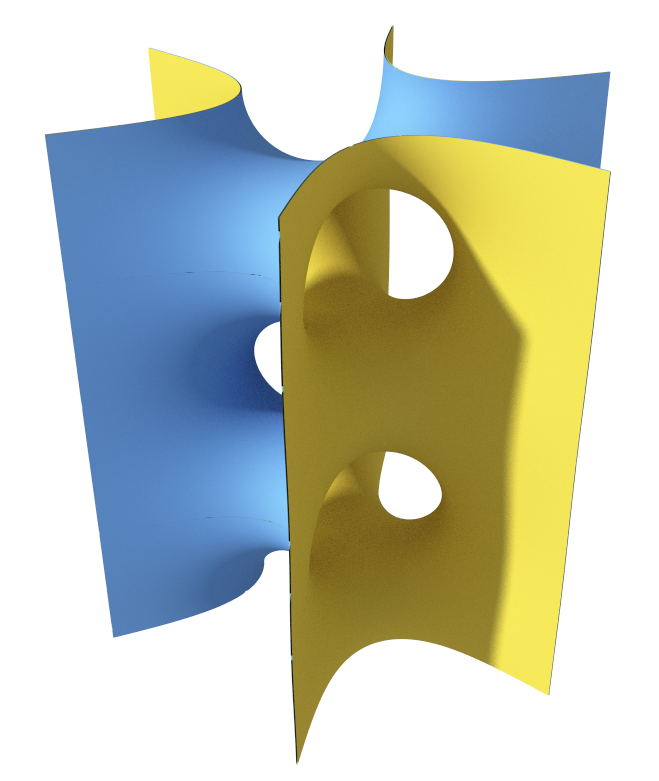
Two periods of a 3-fold saddle tower.

In differential geometry, a saddle tower is a minimal surface family generalizing the singly periodic Scherk's second surface so that it has N-fold (N > 2) symmetry around one axis.

These surfaces are the only properly embedded singly periodic minimal surfaces in $\R^3$ with genus zero and finitely many Scherk-type ends in the quotient.
