= Alfred Enneper =

German mathematician (1830–1885)

Alfred Enneper (June 14, 1830, Barmen – March 24, 1885 Hanover) was a German mathematician. Enneper earned his PhD from the Georg-August-Universität Göttingen in 1856, under the supervision of Peter Gustav Lejeune Dirichlet, for his dissertation about functions with complex arguments. After his habilitation in 1859 in Göttingen, he was from 1870 on Professor (Extraordinarius) at Göttingen.

He studied minimal surfaces and parametrized Enneper's minimal surfaces in 1864. A contemporary of Karl Weierstrass, the two created a whole class of parameterizations, the Enneper–Weierstrass parameterization.
