= Bernstein's problem =

Problem in differential geometry

In differential geometry, Bernstein's problem is as follows: if the graph of a function on R^{n−1} is a minimal surface in R^{n}, does this imply that the function is linear? This is true for n at most 8, but false for n at least 9. The problem is named for Sergei Natanovich Bernstein who solved the case n = 3 in 1914.

== Statement ==
Suppose that f is a function of n − 1 real variables. The graph of f is a surface in R^{n}, and the condition that this is a minimal surface is that f satisfies the minimal surface equation

$$\sum_{i=1}^{n-1} \frac{\partial}{\partial x_i}\frac{\frac{\partial f}{\partial x_i}}{\sqrt{1+\sum_{j=1}^{n-1}\left(\frac{\partial f}{\partial x_j}\right)^2}} = 0$$

Bernstein's problem asks whether an entire function (a function defined throughout R^{n−1} ) that solves this equation is necessarily a degree-1 polynomial.

== History ==
Bernstein (1915–1917) proved Bernstein's theorem that a graph of a real function on R^{2} that is also a minimal surface in R^{3} must be a plane.

Fleming (1962) gave a new proof of Bernstein's theorem by deducing it from the fact that there is no non-planar area-minimizing cone in R^{3}.

De Giorgi (1965) showed that if there is no non-planar area-minimizing cone in R^{n−1} then the analogue of Bernstein's theorem is true for graphs in R^{n}, which in particular implies that it is true in R^{4}.

Almgren (1966) showed there are no non-planar minimizing cones in R^{4}, thus extending Bernstein's theorem to R^{5}.

Simons (1968) showed there are no non-planar minimizing cones in R^{7}, thus extending Bernstein's theorem to R^{8}. He also showed that the surface defined by

$$\{ x \in \mathbb{R}^8 : x_1^2+x_2^2+x_3^2+x_4^2=x_5^2+x_6^2+x_7^2+x_8^2 \}$$

is a locally stable cone in R^{8}, and asked if it is globally area-minimizing.

Bombieri, De Giorgi & Giusti (1969) showed that Simons' cone is indeed globally minimizing, and that in R^{n} for n≥9 there are graphs that are minimal, but not hyperplanes. Combined with the result of Simons, this shows that the analogue of Bernstein's theorem is true in R^{n} for n≤8, and false in higher dimensions.

== See also ==
- Simons cone
