= Costa's minimal surface =

Mathematical concept

Costa's minimal surface, cropped by a sphere

STL model of the surface

In mathematics, Costa's surface is an embedded minimal surface discovered in 1982 by the Brazilian mathematician Celso José da Costa. It is also a surface of finite topology, which means that it can be formed by puncturing a compact surface. Topologically, it is a thrice-punctured torus.

Until its discovery, the plane, helicoid and the catenoid were believed to be the only embedded minimal surfaces that could be formed by puncturing a compact surface. The Costa surface evolves from a torus, which is deformed until the planar end becomes catenoidal. Defining these surfaces on rectangular tori of arbitrary dimensions yields the Costa surface. Its discovery triggered research and discovery into several new surfaces and open conjectures in topology.

The Costa surface can be described using the Weierstrass zeta function and the Weierstrass elliptic function.
