= Soap film =

Thin layers of liquid surrounded by air

Soap films are thin layers of liquid (usually water-based) surrounded by air. For example, if two soap bubbles come into contact, they merge and a thin film is created in between. Thus, foams are composed of a network of films connected by Plateau borders. Soap films can be used as model systems for minimal surfaces, which are widely used in mathematics.

== Stability ==
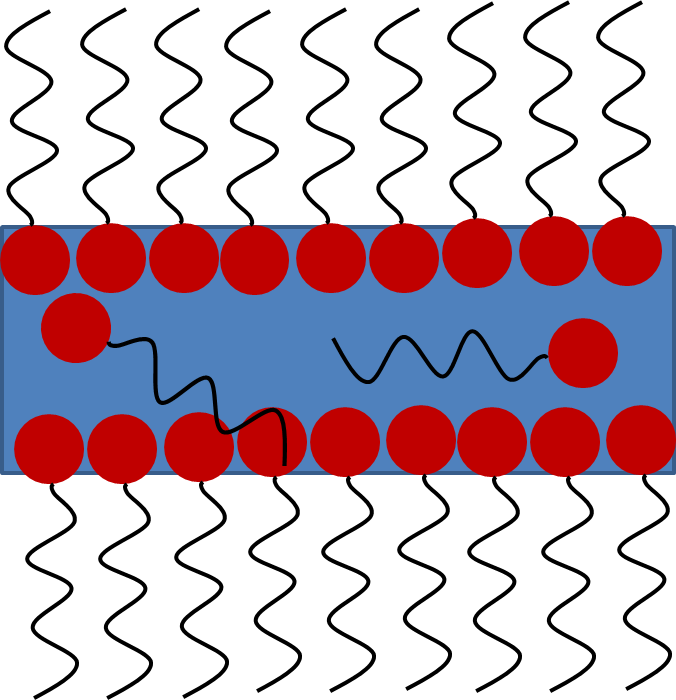
Figure 1: Organisation of surfactants at both surfaces of the soap film

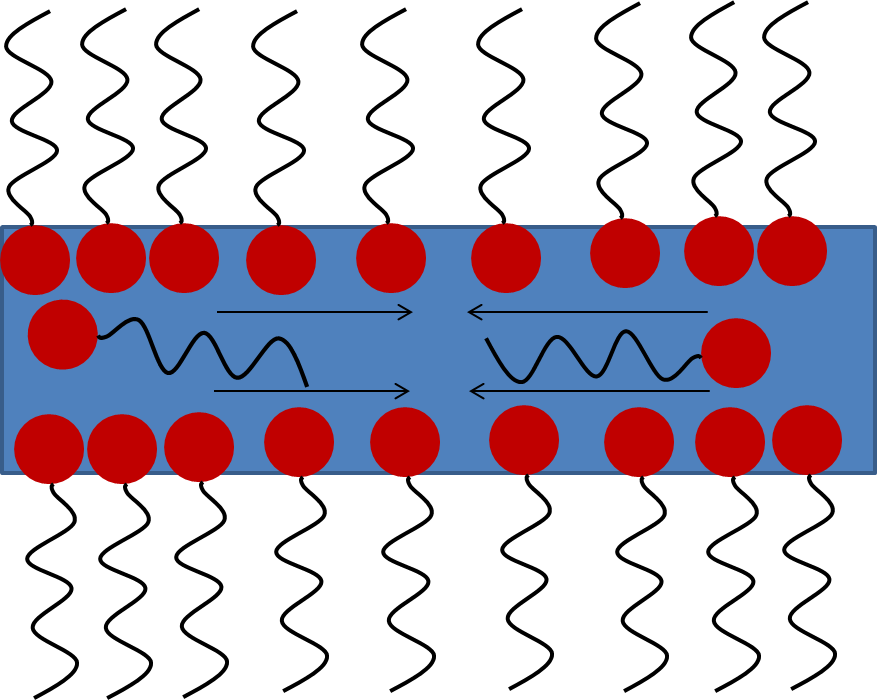
Figure 2: Marangoni surface forces due to inhomogeneities in surfactants concentration. The arrows represent the force direction

Daily experience shows that soap bubble formation is not feasible with water or with any pure liquid. Actually, the presence of soap, which is composed at a molecular scale of surfactants, is necessary to stabilize the film. Most of the time, surfactants are amphiphilic, which means they are molecules with both a hydrophobic and a hydrophilic part. Thus, they are arranged preferentially at the air/water interface (see figure 1).

Surfactants stabilize films because they create a repulsion between both surfaces of the film, preventing it from thinning and consequentially bursting. This can be shown quantitatively through calculations relating to disjoining pressure. The main repulsion mechanisms are steric (the surfactants can not interlace) and electrostatic (if surfactants are charged).

Moreover, surfactants make the film more stable toward thickness fluctuations due to the Marangoni effect. This gives some elasticity to the interface: if surface concentrations are not homogeneously dispersed at the surface, Marangoni forces will tend to re-homogenize the surface concentration (see figure 2).

Even in the presence of stabilizing surfactants, a soap film does not last forever. Water evaporates with time depending on the humidity of the atmosphere. Moreover, as soon as a film is not perfectly horizontal, the liquid flows toward the bottom due to gravity and the liquid accumulates at the bottom. At the top, the film thins and bursts.

== Importance of surface tension: minimal surfaces ==
From a mathematical point of view, soap films are minimal surfaces. Surface tension is the energy that is required to produce the surface, per unit area. A film—like any body or structure—prefers to exist in a state of minimum potential energy. In order to minimize its energy, a droplet of liquid in free space naturally assumes a spherical shape, which has the minimum surface area for a given volume. Puddles and films can exist in of the presence of other forces, like gravity and the intermolecular attraction to the atoms of a substrate. The latter phenomenon is called wetting: binding forces between the substrate atoms and the film atoms can cause the total energy to decrease. In that case, the lowest energy configuration for the body would be one where as many film atoms as possible are as close as possible to the substrate. That would result in an infinitely thin film, infinitely widely spread out over the substrate. In reality, the effect of adherent wetting (causing surface maximization) and the effect of surface tension (causing surface minimization) would balance each other out: the stable configuration can be a droplet, a puddle, or a thin film, depending on the forces that work on the body.

== Colours ==
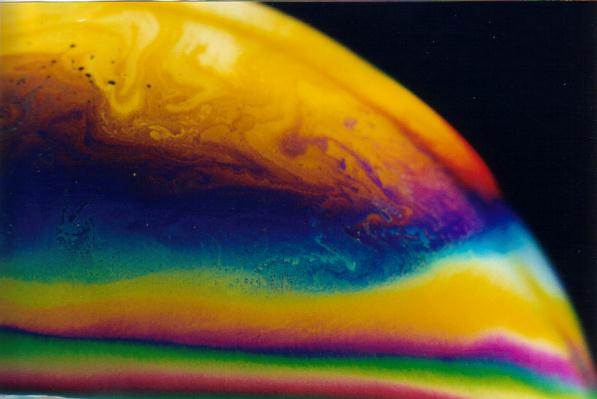
Figure 3: thin film interference in a soap bubble. Notice the golden yellow colour near the top where the film is thin and a few even thinner black spots

The iridescent colours of a soap film are caused by interfering of (internally and externally) reflected light waves, a process called thin film interference and are determined by the thickness of the film. This phenomenon is not the same as the origin of rainbow colours (caused by the refraction of internally reflected light), but rather is the same as the phenomenon causing the colours in an oil slick on a wet road.

== Drainage ==
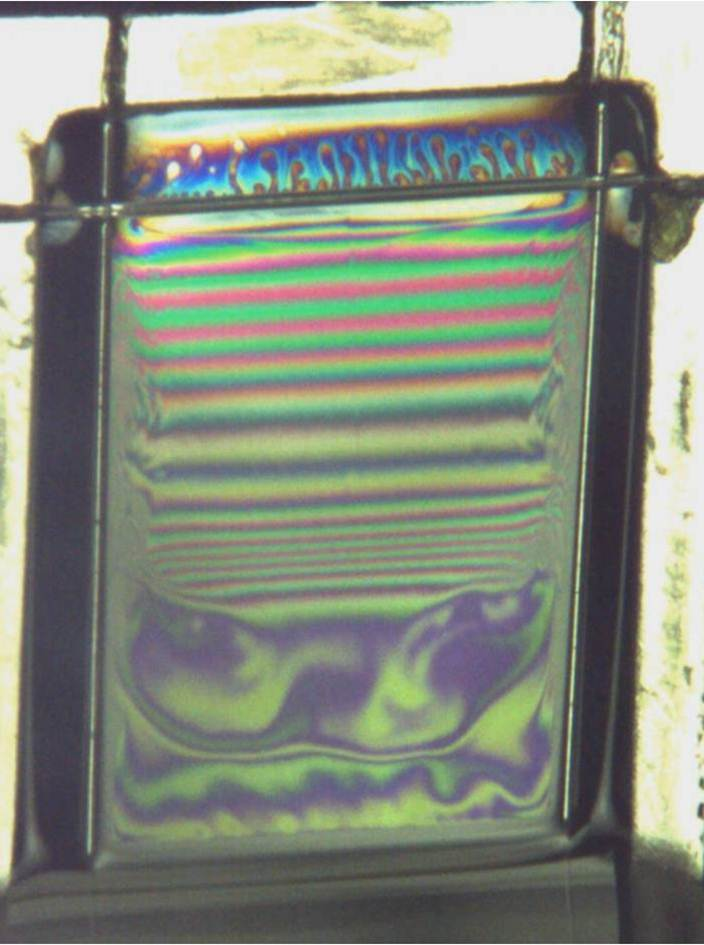
Figure 4: Picture of a film taken during its generation. The film is pulled out of a soapy solution and drains from the top.

If surfactants are well chosen and the atmospheric humidity and air movements are suitably controlled, a horizontal soap film can last from minutes to hours. In contrast, a vertical soap film is affected by gravity and so the liquid tends to drain, causing the soap film to thin at the top. Colour depends on film thickness, which accounts for the coloured interference fringes that can be seen at the top of figure 4.

== Black spots ==
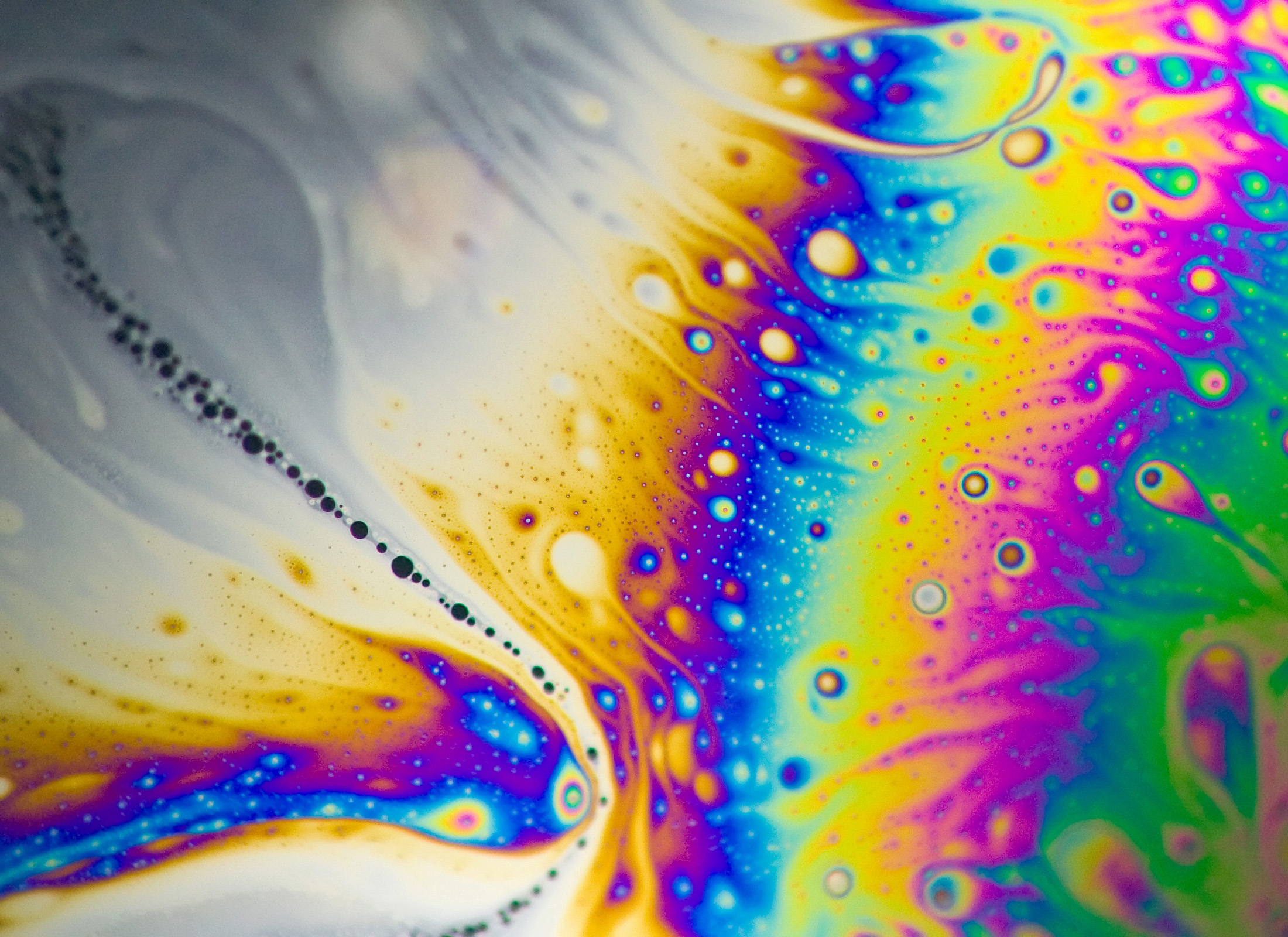
Figure 5: Magnified view of black spots in a soap film

During the late stages of draining, sharp-edged black spots start to form. These spots are significantly thinner (< 100 nm) than the normal soap film, giving rise to their black interference colour. Whether black spots can form depends on the concentration of the soap, and moreover there are two types of black films:

- Common black films, around 50 nm in thickness, and
- Newton black films, around 4 nm in thickness, require a higher electrolyte concentration. In these films the outer soap surfaces have effectively snapped together and pinched out most of the inner liquid.

As drainage continues, the black spots eventually take over the entire soap film, and despite its extreme thinness, the final black film can be quite stable and can survive for many minutes.

== Bursting ==
If a soap film is unstable, it ends by bursting. A hole is created somewhere in the film and opens very rapidly. Surface tension indeed leads to surface minimization and, thus, to film disappearance. The hole aperture is not instantaneous and is slowed by the liquid inertia. The balance between the forces of inertia and surface tension leads to the opening velocity: $V=\sqrt{\frac{2\gamma}{\rho h}}$ where $\gamma$ is the liquid surface tension, $\rho$ is the liquid density and $h$ is the film thickness.

Scale	Generation	Structure	Stability	Dynamic	Experiments and characterization	Transport properties	Irisations	Maths	Applications	Fun
Surfactants		Micelles, HLB		Surface rheology, adsorption	Langmuir trough, ellipsometry, Xray, surface rheology					
Films	Frankel's law	Surface tension, DLVO, disjoining pressure	dewetting, bursting	Marangoni, surface rheology	Interferometry, Thin film balance		Interferences	double bubble theorem		Giant films
Bubbles		shape, Plateau's laws	foam drainage	T1 process		acoustics, electric	Interferences	double bubble theory		Giant bubbles, coloured bubbles, freezing
Foam		Liquid fraction, metastable state	Coalescence, avalanches, coarsening, foam drainage	rheology	light scattering acoustics, conductimetry, Surface Evolver, bubble model, Potts' model	acoustics, light scattering	light scattering	Packing and topology	Aquafoams	
