= Catenoid =

Surface of revolution of a catenary

A catenoid

A catenoid obtained from the rotation of a catenary

In geometry, a catenoid is a type of surface, arising by rotating a catenary curve about an axis (a surface of revolution). It is a minimal surface, meaning that it occupies the least area when bounded by a closed space. It was formally described in 1744 by the mathematician Leonhard Euler.

Soap film attached to twin circular rings will take the shape of a catenoid. Because they are members of the same associate family of surfaces, a catenoid can be bent into a portion of a helicoid, and vice versa.

== Geometry ==
The catenoid was the first non-trivial minimal surface in 3-dimensional Euclidean space to be discovered apart from the plane. The catenoid is obtained by rotating a catenary about its directrix. It was found and proved to be minimal by Leonhard Euler in 1744.

Early work on the subject was published also by Jean Baptiste Meusnier. There are only two minimal surfaces of revolution (surfaces of revolution which are also minimal surfaces): the plane and the catenoid.

The catenoid may be defined by the following parametric equations:

$$\begin{align} x &= c \cosh \frac{v}{c} \cos u \\ y &= c \cosh \frac{v}{c} \sin u \\ z &= v \end{align}$$	1

where $u \in [-\pi, \pi)$ and $v \in \mathbb{R}$ and $c$ is a non-zero real constant.

In cylindrical coordinates:
$$\rho =c \cosh \frac{z}{c},$$
where $c$ is a real constant.

A physical model of a catenoid can be formed by dipping two circular rings into a soap solution and slowly drawing the circles apart.

The catenoid may be also defined approximately by the stretched grid method as a facet 3D model.

== Helicoid transformation ==
Deformation of a right-handed helicoid into a left-handed one and back again via a catenoid

Because they are members of the same associate family of surfaces, one can bend a catenoid into a portion of a helicoid without stretching. In other words, one can make a (mostly) continuous and isometric deformation of a catenoid to a portion of the helicoid such that every member of the deformation family is minimal (having a mean curvature of zero). A parametrization of such a deformation is given by the system
$$\begin{align}
x(u,v) &= \sin \theta \,\cosh v \,\cos u + \cos \theta \,\sinh v \,\sin u \\
y(u,v) &= \sin \theta \,\cosh v \,\sin u - \cos \theta \,\sinh v \,\cos u \\
z(u,v) &=  v \sin \theta + u \cos \theta
\end{align}$$
for $(u,v) \in (-\pi, \pi] \times (-\infty, \infty)$, with deformation parameter $-\pi < \theta \le \pi$, where:

- $\theta = \pi$ corresponds to a right-handed helicoid,
- $\theta = \pm \pi / 2$ corresponds to a catenoid, and
- $\theta = 0$ corresponds to a left-handed helicoid.

== The critical catenoid conjecture ==
A critical catenoid is a catenoid in the unit ball that meets the boundary sphere orthogonally. Up to rotation about the origin, it is given by rescaling Eq. 1 with $c=1$ by a factor $(\rho_0\cosh\rho_0)^{-1}$, where $\rho_0\tanh\rho_0=1$. It is an embedded annular solution of the free boundary problem for the area functional in the unit ball and the critical catenoid conjecture states that it is the unique such annulus.

The similarity of the critical catenoid conjecture to Hsiang-Lawson's conjecture on the Clifford torus in the 3-sphere, which was proven by Simon Brendle in 2012, has driven interest in the conjecture, as has its relationship to the Steklov eigenvalue problem.

Nitsche proved in 1985 that the only immersed minimal disk in the unit ball with free boundary is an equatorial totally geodesic disk. Nitsche also claimed without proof in the same paper that any free boundary constant mean curvature annulus in the unit ball is rotationally symmetric, and hence a catenoid or a parallel surface. Non-embedded counterexamples to Nitsche’s claim have since been constructed.

The critical catenoid conjecture is stated in the embedded case by Fraser and Li and has been proven by McGrath with the extra assumption that the annulus is reflection invariant through coordinate planes, and by Kusner and McGrath when the annulus has antipodal symmetry.

In September 2026, Chodosh and Gianocca, and separately Parise and Zhu, presented proofs of the critical catenoid conjecture in preprints.

In geodesic balls of the open hemisphere $\mathbb{S}^3_+$ of the 3-sphere and of hyperbolic 3-space $\mathbb{H}^3$, the role of the critical catenoid is played by the critical spherical catenoids, which are rotationally symmetric free boundary minimal annuli. Medvedev conjectured the analogue of the critical catenoid conjecture in this setting, namely that the critical spherical catenoids are the only embedded free boundary minimal annuli in such balls, and a similar conjecture for geodesic balls of the 3-sphere was formulated by Cerezo, Fernández and Mira. In a 2025 preprint, Lima extended the theorem of Kusner and McGrath to this setting, proving that an embedded free boundary minimal annulus in a geodesic ball of $\mathbb{S}^3_+$ or $\mathbb{H}^3$ that is invariant under the antipodal map of the ball is rotationally symmetric.

== Morse index of critical catenoids ==
The critical catenoid has Morse index 4 with respect to deformations that keep its boundary on the sphere. Devyver also proved that every orientable free boundary minimal surface in the unit ball other than a flat disk through the center has index at least 4, so the critical catenoid attains this lower bound. Its nullity is 2: the Jacobi fields satisfying the free boundary condition are exactly those induced by rotations of the ball about axes perpendicular to the axis of the catenoid.

For the critical spherical catenoids, Medvedev proved that the Morse index is 4 in geodesic balls of $\mathbb{S}^3_+$ and at least 4 in geodesic balls of $\mathbb{H}^3$, and conjectured that it is also 4 in the hyperbolic case. In a 2026 preprint, Dorofeev and Pigazzini presented a proof of this conjecture, showing that every critical spherical catenoid in a geodesic ball of $\mathbb{H}^3$ has Morse index 4 and nullity 2 and that, as in the Euclidean case, its Jacobi fields satisfying the free boundary condition are exactly those induced by rotations of the ball about axes perpendicular to the axis of the catenoid.
