= Periodic graph =

Periodic graph may refer to:

- Periodic graph (crystallography) or crystal net, a Euclidean graph representing the atomic or molecular structure of a crystal
- Periodic graph (geometry), a Euclidean graph preserved under a lattice of translations
- Periodic graph (graph theory), a graph that is periodic with respect to a graph theoretic operator
