= Neovius surface =

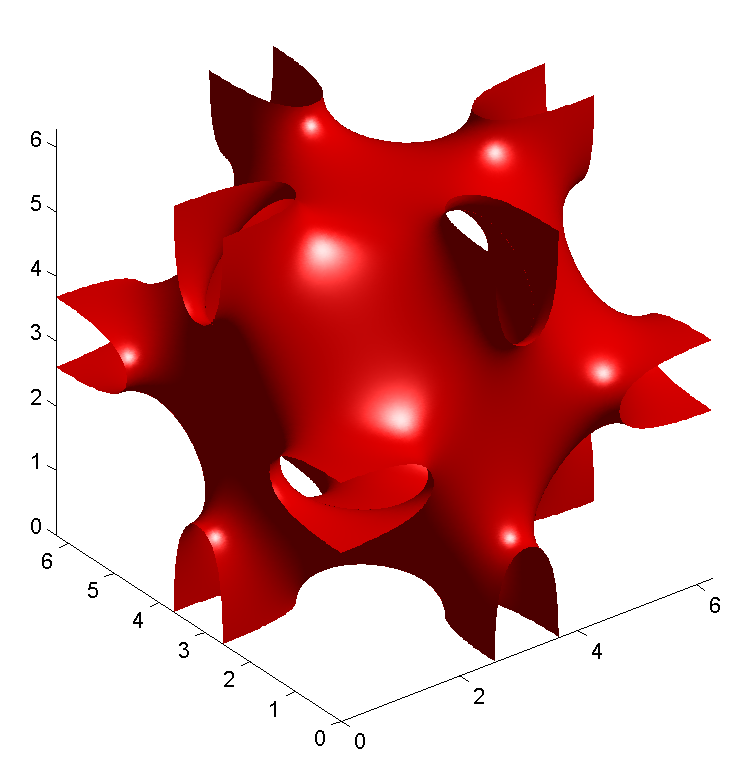
Neovius' minimal surface in a unit cell.

In differential geometry, the Neovius surface is a triply periodic minimal surface originally discovered by Finnish mathematician Edvard Rudolf Neovius, an uncle of Rolf Nevanlinna.

The surface has genus 9, dividing space into two infinite non-equivalent labyrinths. Like many other triply periodic minimal surfaces it has been studied in relation to the microstructure of block copolymers, surfactant-water mixtures, and crystallography of soft materials.

It can be approximated with the level set surface

$$3(\cos x + \cos y + \cos z) +  4 \cos x \cos y \cos z  = 0$$

In Schoen's categorisation it is called the C(P) surface, since it is the "complement" of the Schwarz P surface. It can be extended with further handles, converging towards the expanded regular octahedron (in Schoen's categorisation)
