= Laves graph =

Periodic spatial graph

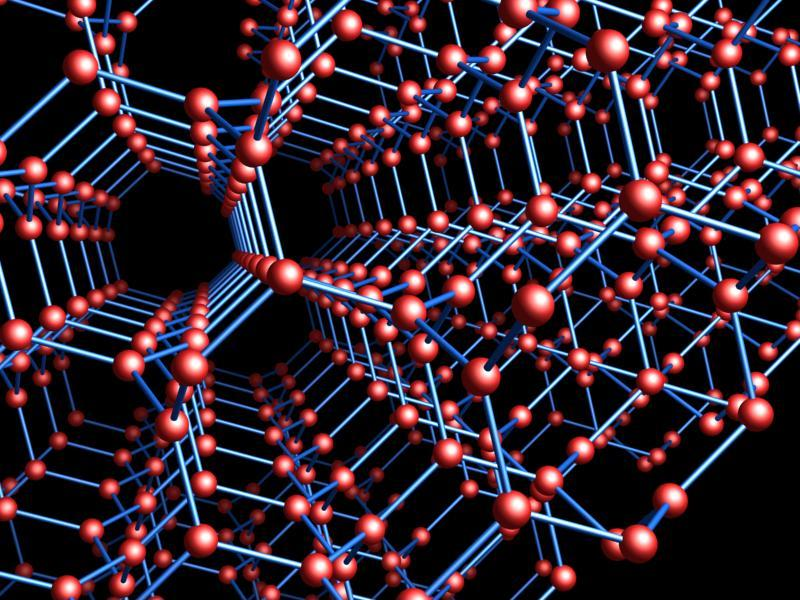
The Laves graph

In geometry and crystallography, the Laves graph is an infinite and highly symmetric system of points and line segments in three-dimensional Euclidean space, forming a periodic graph. Three equal-length segments meet at 120° angles at each point, and all cycles use ten or more segments. It is the shortest possible triply periodic graph, relative to the volume of its fundamental domain. One arrangement of the Laves graph uses one out of every eight of the points in the integer lattice as its points, and connects all pairs of these points that are nearest neighbors, at distance $\sqrt2$. It can also be defined, divorced from its geometry, as an abstract undirected graph, a covering graph of the complete graph on four vertices.

H. S. M. Coxeter (1955) named this graph after Fritz Laves, who first wrote about it as a crystal structure in 1932. It has also been called the K_{4} crystal, (10,3)-a network, diamond twin, triamond, and the srs net. The regions of space nearest each vertex of the graph are congruent 17-sided polyhedra that tile space. Its edges lie on diagonals of the regular skew polyhedron, a surface with six squares meeting at each integer point of space.

Several crystalline chemicals have known or predicted structures in the form of the Laves graph. Thickening the edges of the Laves graph to cylinders produces a related minimal surface, the gyroid, which appears physically in certain soap film structures and in the wings of butterflies.

== Constructions ==
=== From the integer grid ===
The regular skew polyhedron onto which the Laves graph can be inscribed. The edges of the Laves graph are diagonals of some of the squares of this polyhedral surface.

As Coxeter (1955) describes, the vertices of the Laves graph can be defined by selecting one out of every eight points in the three-dimensional integer lattice, and forming their nearest neighbor graph. Specifically, one chooses the points
$$\begin{align}(0,0,0),\quad (1,2,3),\quad (2,3,1),\quad (3,1,2),\\
(2,2,2),\quad (3,0,1),\quad (0,1,3),\quad (1,3,0),\\
\end{align}$$
and all the other points formed by adding multiples of four to these coordinates. The edges of the Laves graph connect pairs of points whose Euclidean distance from each other is the square root of two, $\sqrt{2}$, as the points of each pair differ by one unit in two coordinates, and are the same in the third coordinate. The edges meet at 120° angles at each vertex, in a flat plane. All pairs of vertices that are non-adjacent are farther apart, at a distance of at least $\sqrt{6}$ from each other. The edges of the resulting geometric graph are diagonals of a subset of the faces of the regular skew polyhedron with six square faces per vertex, so the Laves graph is embedded in this skew polyhedron.

It is possible to choose a larger set of one out of every four points of the integer lattice, so that the graph of distance-$\sqrt{2}$ pairs of this larger set forms two mirror-image copies of the Laves graph, disconnected from each other, with all other pairs of points farther than $\sqrt{2}$ apart.

=== As a covering graph ===
As an abstract graph, the Laves graph can be constructed as the maximal abelian covering graph of the complete graph $K_4$. Being an abelian covering graph of $K_4$ means that the vertices of the Laves graph can be four-colored such that each vertex has neighbors of the other three colors and so that there are color-preserving symmetries taking any vertex to any other vertex with the same color. For the Laves graph in its geometric form with integer coordinates, these symmetries are translations that add even numbers to each coordinate (additionally, the offsets of all three coordinates must be congruent modulo four). When applying two such translations in succession, the net translation is irrespective of their order: they commute with each other, forming an abelian group. The translation vectors of this group form a three-dimensional lattice. Finally, being a maximal abelian covering graph means that there is no other covering graph of $K_4$ involving a higher-dimensional lattice. This construction justifies an alternative name of the Laves graph, the $K_4$ crystal.

A maximal abelian covering graph can be constructed from any finite graph $G$; applied to $K_4$, the construction produces the (abstract) Laves graph, but does not give it the same geometric layout. Choose a spanning tree of $G$, let $d$ be the number of edges that are not in the spanning tree (in this case, three non-tree edges), and choose a distinct unit vector in $\mathbb{Z}^d$ for each of these non-tree edges. Then, fix the set of vertices of the covering graph to be the ordered pairs $(v,w)$ where $v$ is a vertex of $G$ and $w$ is a vector in $\mathbb{Z}^d$. For each such pair, and each edge $uv$ adjacent to $v$ in $G$, make an edge from $(v, w)$ to $(u,w\plusmn\epsilon)$ where $\epsilon$ is the zero vector if $uv$ belongs to the spanning tree, and is otherwise the basis vector associated with $uv$, and where the plus or minus sign is chosen according to the direction the edge is traversed. The resulting graph is independent of the chosen spanning tree, and the same construction can also be interpreted more abstractly using homology.

Using the same construction, the hexagonal tiling of the plane is the maximal abelian covering graph of the three-edge dipole graph, and the diamond cubic is the maximal abelian covering graph of the four-edge dipole. The $d$-dimensional integer lattice (as a graph with unit-length edges) is the maximal abelian covering graph of a graph with one vertex and $d$ self-loops.

=== As a unit distance graph ===
The unit distance graph on the three-dimensional integer lattice has a vertex for each lattice point; each vertex has exactly six neighbors. It is possible to remove some of the points from the lattice, so that each remaining point has exactly three remaining neighbors, and so that the induced subgraph of these points has no cycles shorter than ten edges. There are four ways to do this, one of which is isomorphic as an abstract graph to the Laves graph. However, its vertices are in different positions than the more-symmetric, conventional geometric construction.

Another subgraph of the simple cubic net isomorphic to the Laves graph is obtained by removing half of the edges in a certain way. The resulting structure, called semi-simple cubic lattice, also has lower symmetry than the Laves graph itself.

== Properties ==
The Laves graph is a cubic graph, meaning that there are exactly three edges at each vertex. Every pair of a vertex and adjacent edge can be transformed into every other such pair by a symmetry of the graph, so it is a symmetric graph. More strongly, for every two vertices $u$ and $v$, every one-to-one correspondence between the three edges incident to $u$ and the three edges incident to $v$ can be realized by a symmetry. However, the overall structure is chiral: no sequence of translations and rotations can make it coincide with its mirror image. The symmetry group of the Laves graph is the space group $I4_132$.

The girth of this structure is 10—the shortest cycles in the graph have 10 vertices—and 15 of these cycles pass through each vertex. The numbers of vertices at distance 0, 1, 2, ... from any vertex (forming the coordination sequence of the Laves graph) are:

1, 3, 6, 12, 24, 35, 48, 69, 86, 108, 138, 161, 192, 231, ... (sequence A038620 in the OEIS).
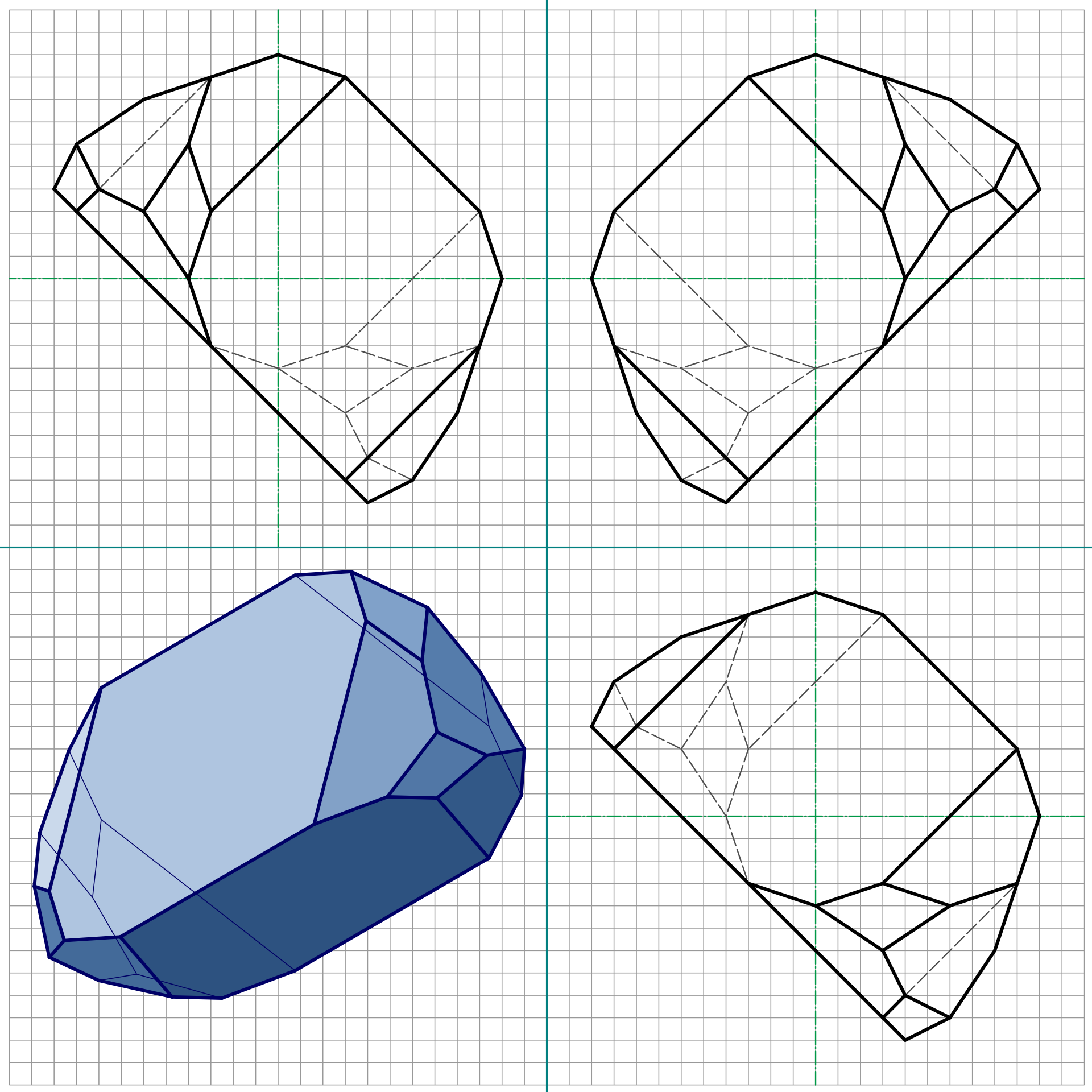
Cells of the Voronoi diagram of the Laves graph

If the surrounding space is partitioned into the regions nearest each vertex—the cells of the Voronoi diagram of this structure—these form heptadecahedra with 17 faces each. They are plesiohedra, polyhedra that tile space isohedrally. Experimenting with the structures formed by these polyhedra led physicist Alan Schoen to discover the gyroid minimal surface, which is topologically equivalent to the surface obtained by thickening the edges of the Laves graph to cylinders and taking the boundary of their union.

The Laves graph is the unique shortest triply-periodic network, in the following sense. Triply-periodic means repeating infinitely in all three dimensions of space, so a triply-periodic network is a connected geometric graph with a three-dimensional lattice of translational symmetries. A fundamental domain is any shape that can tile space with its translated copies under these symmetries. Any lattice has infinitely many choices of fundamental domain, of varying shapes, but they all have the same volume $V$. One can also measure the length of the edges of the network within a single copy of the fundamental domain; call this number $L$. Similarly to $V$, $L$ does not depend on the choice of fundamental domain, as long as the domain boundary only crosses the edges, rather than containing parts of their length. The Laves graph has four symmetry classes of vertices (orbits), because the symmetries considered here are only translations, not the rotations needed to map these four classes into each other. Each symmetry class has one vertex in any fundamental domain, so the fundamental domain contains twelve half-edges, with total length $6\sqrt2$. The volume of its fundamental domain is 32. From these two numbers, the ratio $L^3/V$ (a dimensionless quantity) is therefore $27/\sqrt2$. This is in fact the minimum possible value: All triply-periodic networks have
$$\frac{L^3}{V}\ge \frac{27}{\sqrt2},$$
with equality only in the case of the Laves graph.

== Physical examples ==
3D model of part of the Laves graph

=== Art ===
A sculpture titled Bamboozle, by Jacobus Verhoeff and his son Tom Verhoeff, is in the form of a fragment of the Laves graph, with its vertices represented by multicolored interlocking acrylic triangles. It was installed in 2013 at the Eindhoven University of Technology.

=== Molecular crystals ===
The Laves graph has been suggested as an allotrope of carbon, analogous to the more common graphene and graphite carbon structure which also have three bonds per atom at 120° angles. In graphene, adjacent atoms have the same bonding planes as each other, whereas in the Laves graph structure the bonding planes of adjacent atoms are twisted by an angle of approximately 70.5° around the line of the bond. However, this hypothetical carbon allotrope turns out to be unstable.

The Laves graph may also give a crystal structure for boron, one which computations predict should be stable. Other chemicals that may form this structure include SrSi_{2} (from which the "srs net" name derives) and elemental nitrogen, as well as certain metal–organic frameworks and cyclic hydrocarbons.

The electronic band structure for the tight-binding model of the Laves graph has been studied, showing the existence of Dirac and Weyl points in this structure.

=== Other ===
The structure of the Laves graph, and of gyroid surfaces derived from it, has also been observed experimentally in soap-water systems, and in the chitin networks of butterfly wing scales.
