= Solvent vapour annealing =

Chemistry technique

Solvent vapor annealing (SVA) is a widely used technique for controlling the morphology and ordering of block copolymer (BCP) films. By controlling the block ratio (f = NA/N), spheres, cylinders, gyroids, and lamellae structures can be generated by forming a swollen and mobile layer of thin-film from added solvent vapor to facilitate the self-assembly of the polymer blocks. The process allows increased lateral ordering by several magnitudes to previous methods. It is a more mild alternative to thermal annealing.

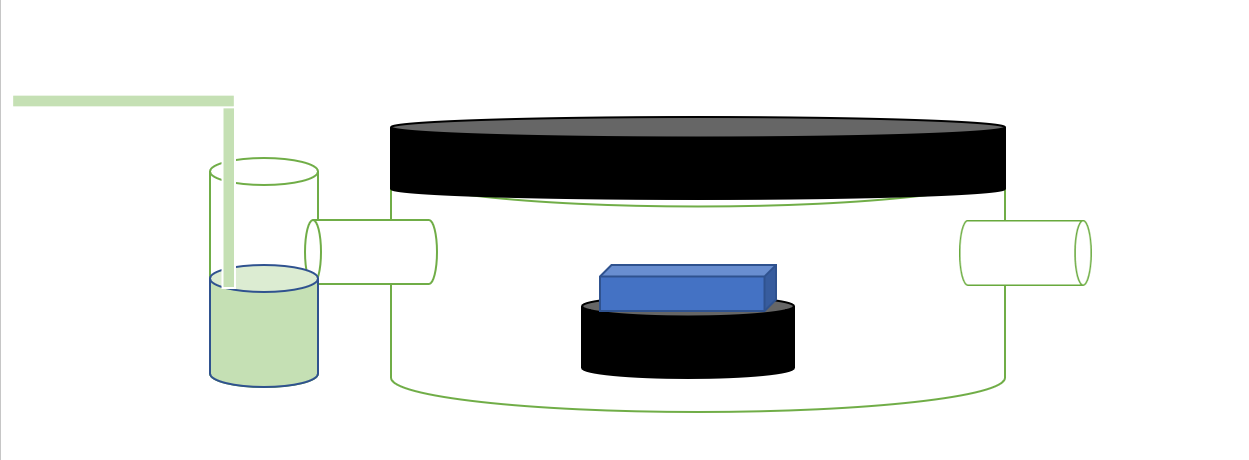
This is a basic outline for the chamber used in high precision vapor annealing. The gas/vapor fed in is illustrated in green and fed into a highly pressurized chamber where the block co-polymer is depicted in blue to go through the process from the vapor.

Ideally, the chamber in which SVA takes place is a metal chamber that is inert to reaction with the given solvent, allowing for high precision in forming the desired nanostructures. Computers with designed program control of the valves for solvent addition and withdrawal are used to increase precision as well. This regulated inlet along with close monitoring of pressure gauges and thickness allows instant response and control while the annealing and evaporation phases precede.

== Factors Affecting SVA ==
When looking at what affects SVA, one of the main things that come up first is the solvent that is used, and what nanostructure is wanted to be obtained. For example, if a hierarchical structure is desired, a solvent that has a vapor that can selectively mobilize the amorphous polymer chains of a semi-crystalline polymer is ideal because it can also keep the integrity of the crystals, allowing for the secondary structure to form.

Looking more at BCP itself, they make ordered nanostructures because of thermodynamic differences between different blocks of the polymer. The sample morphology at equilibrium can be predicted using the molar mass of the blocks, the degree of polymerization of the chains (N), and the Flory-Huggins interaction parameter (χ) which is a magnitude of exactly how incompatible the different blocks are. These factors, along with the composition of the BCP, allow microphase separation of chains and the rearrangement into the desired product. The composition provides an especially important part of the process as knowing the ordering, such as alternating AB monomers, gives light on how to section the polymer in the desired manner.

Along with this, the selection of a specific type of block polymer is important for the process and its effectiveness. The main thing to consider is the original structure of the block at room temperature, as well as, temperatures in which each block will begin to change phase. Knowing these temperatures is critical in determining when each will begin to react and take in solvent and at what rate this will happen, which is critical in pushing to a desired morphology of the given block polymer through annealing.

Other factors that affect SVA are parameters such as vapor pressure, solvent concertation in the film, and evaporation rate of the solvent. Each of these factors contributes to the volatility and imprecision at times of this method, not possessing a set mechanism for the construction of structures that are desired, such as nanocylinders. Getting perfect success of the desired morphology of a polymer has yet to be achieved with these plethoras of factors dictating formation.

== Applications ==
There are many applications in technology and lab work for this process to create desired morphologies of polymers. One of these applications is inscribing secondary nanostructures onto electrospun fibers. The use of poly(ε‐caprolactone) fibers, known as PCL, allows using solvents like acetone to move the amorphous chains of block polymers onto a pre-existing crystal, making the inscribed secondary structure. When the PCL is annealed with acetone, the amorphous chains can be mobilized to a given desired region, while the overall integrity of the fully crystallized regions stays intact. With a careful approach to the semi-crystalline polymer chosen and looking for appropriate solvent vapor, this simple process can be applied to many different systems and allows for the creation of many types of hierarchical polymer material.

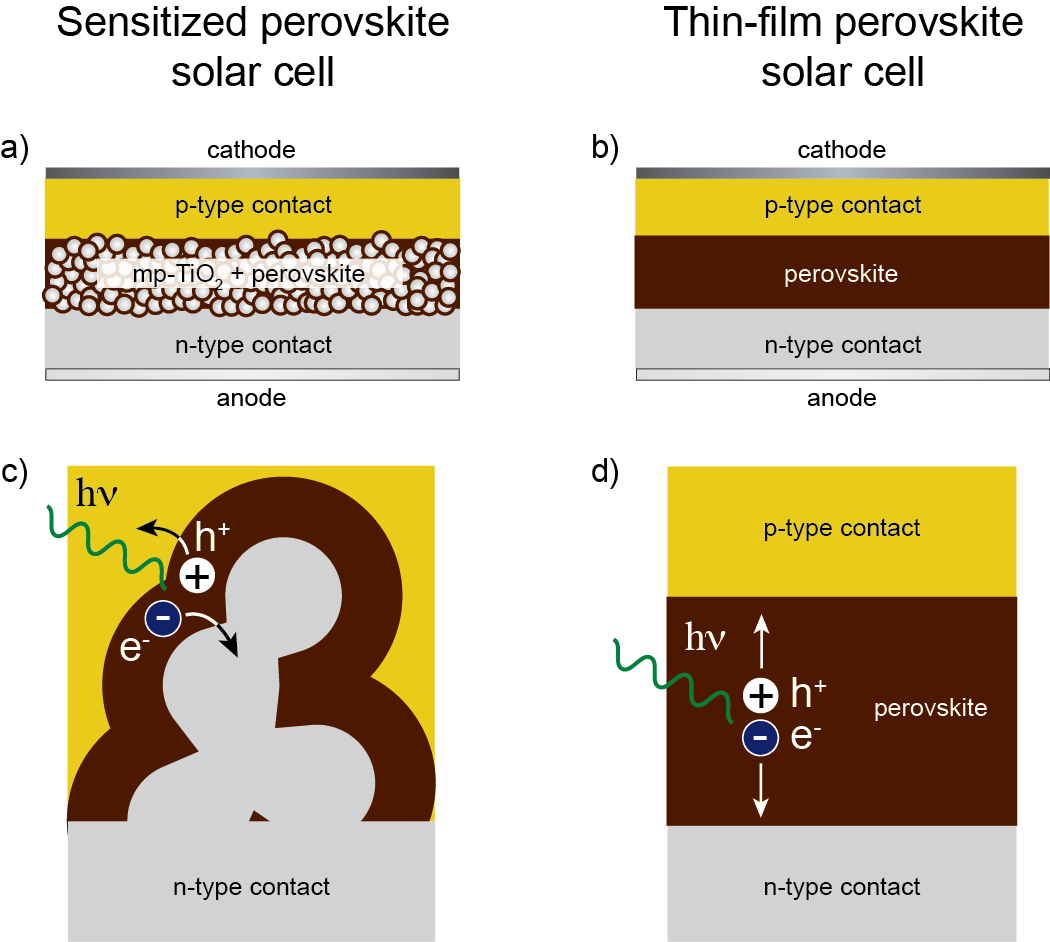
This figure shows a simple schematic of what a perovskite solar cell, specifically the thin film, looks like to give imagery to how improving the efficiency of the material though SVA allows for higher energy retention and power.

Another application of SVA is its use in helping create and improve photovoltaic device efficiency through the annealing of perovskite materials. For the greater performance of these energy cells, the keys lie with higher quality perovskite materials and on the use of SVA to create these higher quality films that can retain energy more efficiently. Solvent engineering is the key to make the perovskite material and improving their quality through SVA in an anhydrous isopropanol environment, where the crystalline polymer has low solubility, which causes the performance to increase greatly. The use of SVA here leads to a more energy-efficient and promising path of using specific polymers to help move forward with the improvement of energy storage.

== Challenges and Areas to Focus on for Improvement ==
There are some main areas of focus that can be looked at for the future of SVA to keep improving and being innovational in technology. Firstly, the chambers in which SVA takes place should continue to be improved on to allow precision of the process, as well as, reproducibility of the same structure on each attempt. The focus on these chambers and the components that make it precise have been a hypothetical thought process of what parameters affect reproducibility. It is imperative to continue to improve the amount of control over the annealing through being able to control all factors, such as humidity and temperature. The point of being meticulous in defining such parameters is for the possibility of multiple labs reproducing a certain compound to the same effect.

Next off, SVA with the improvement of the apparatus in which the process takes place, in situ studies, through X-ray and neutron scattering methods, can give more highly accurate images of the swollen and dried states of the BCP. Using methods such as also ellipsometry and interferometry can lead to discoveries about the thickness of the polymers in different states and nanostructure orientation, which will help to learn more about the equilibrium structure and the kinetics of developing a specified morphology. It is important here as well to be able to define small molecule additions to different parts of the block polymer at different points of the annealing and evaporation as to accurately be able to precisely know how the moieties will create certain orientations and directionality in structure. The final area moving forward is simply the implementation of the created block polymers in new intended applications and technology, beyond lab study and characterization of the method. It is important to go beyond creating the nanostructures and move into seeing the utility of the structures in an application, which will help reveal practical shortcomings of the created polymers and reveal areas of where to improve in parts of the structure, such as film integrity and attachment strength of the amorphous chains. Going beyond these simple surface imaging will allow us to realize and face some of the dangers and hindrances to functionality, such as the toxicity of working with organic solvents or the issues with dewetting the swollen state of the BCP.
