= Triply periodic minimal surface =

Concept in differential geometry

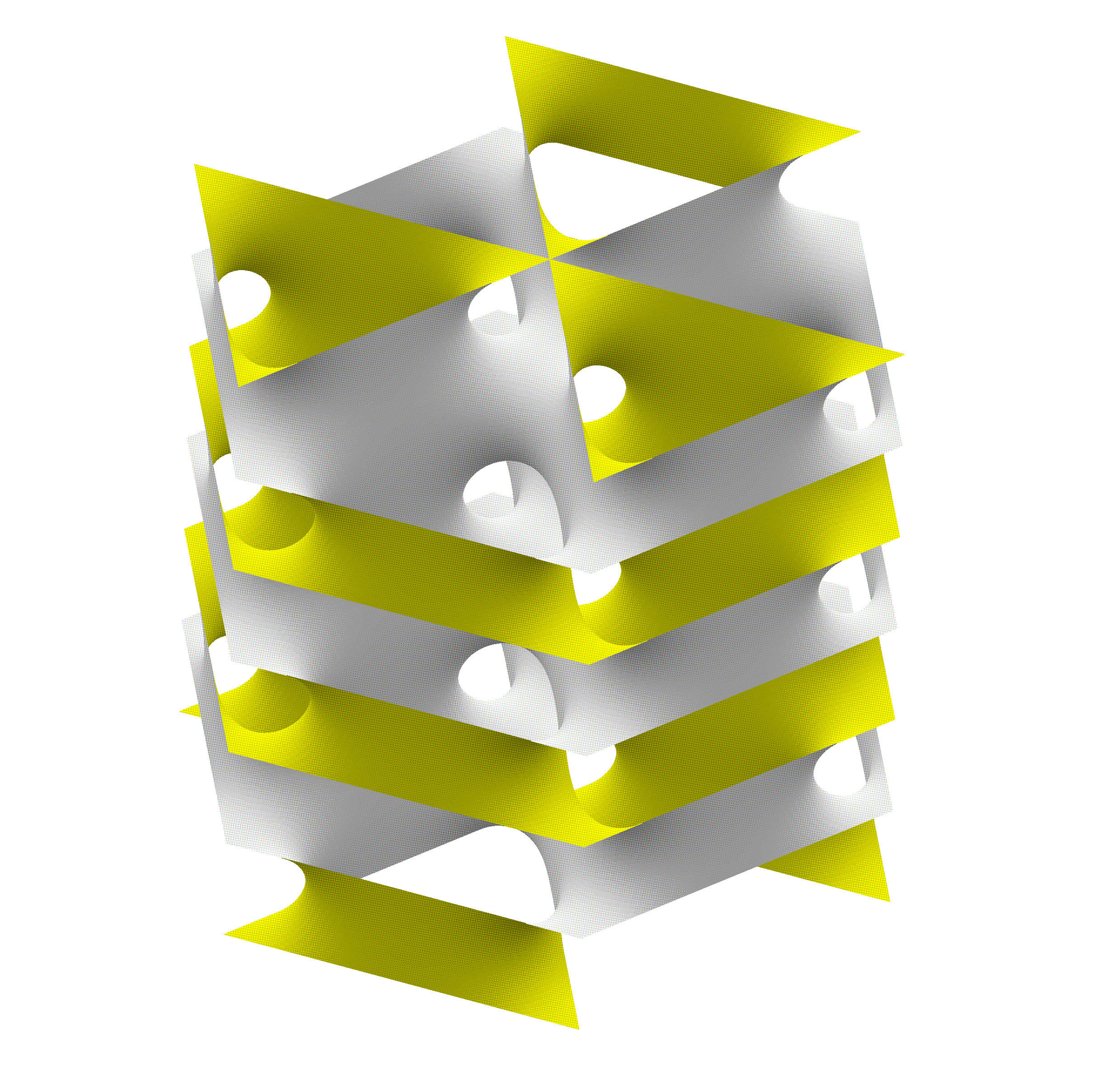
Schwarz H surface

In differential geometry, a triply periodic minimal surface (TPMS) is a minimal surface in $\mathbb{R}^3$ that is invariant under a rank-3 lattice of translations.

These surfaces have the symmetries of a crystallographic group. Numerous examples are known with cubic, tetragonal, rhombohedral, and orthorhombic symmetries. Monoclinic and triclinic examples are certain to exist, but have proven hard to parametrise.

TPMS are of relevance in natural science. TPMS have been observed as biological membranes, as block copolymers, equipotential surfaces in crystals etc. Their approximants have been used to model bone substitutes. They have also been of interest in architecture, design and art.

== Properties ==
Nearly all studied TPMS are free of self-intersections (i.e. embedded in $\mathbb{R}^3$): from a mathematical standpoint they are the most interesting (since self-intersecting surfaces are trivially abundant).

All connected TPMS have genus ≥ 3, and in every lattice there exist orientable embedded TPMS of every genus ≥3.

Embedded TPMS are orientable and divide space into two disjoint sub-volumes (labyrinths). If they are congruent the surface is said to be a balance surface.

== History ==
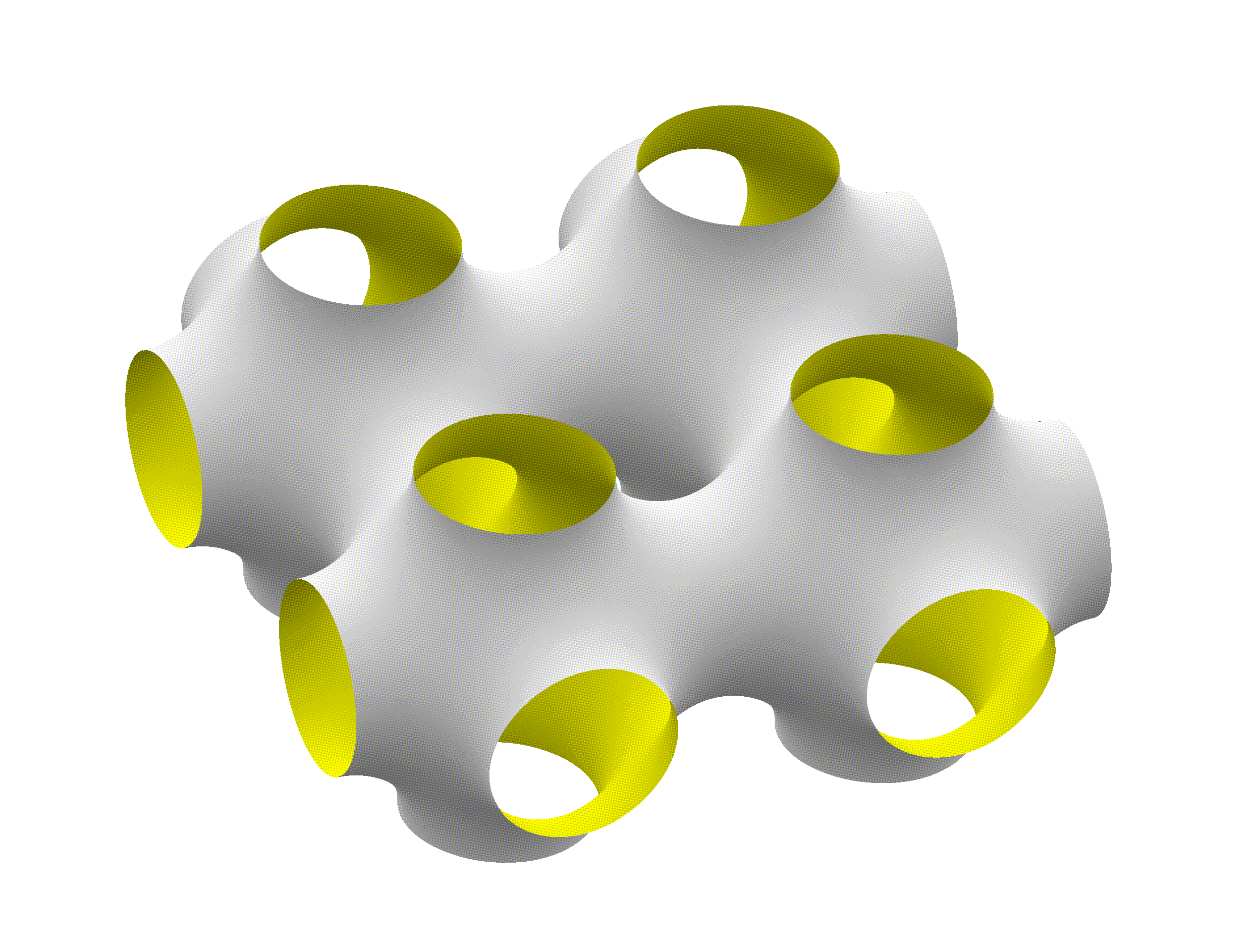
Schwarz P surface

The first examples of TPMS were the surfaces described by Schwarz in 1865, followed by a surface described by his student E. R. Neovius in 1883.

In 1970 Alan Schoen came up with 12 new TPMS based on skeleton graphs spanning crystallographic cells. While Schoen's surfaces became popular in natural science the construction did not lend itself to a mathematical existence proof and remained largely unknown in mathematics, until H. Karcher proved their existence in 1989.

Using conjugate surfaces many more surfaces were found. While Weierstrass representations are known for the simpler examples, they are not known for many surfaces. Instead methods from Discrete differential geometry are often used.

== Families ==
The classification of TPMS is an open problem.

TPMS often come in families that can be continuously deformed into each other. Meeks found an explicit 5-parameter family for genus 3 TPMS that contained all then known examples of genus 3 surfaces except the gyroid. Members of this family can be continuously deformed into each other, remaining embedded in the process (although the lattice may change). The gyroid and lidinoid are each inside a separate 1-parameter family.

Another approach to classifying TPMS is to examine their space groups. For surfaces containing lines the possible boundary polygons can be enumerated, providing a classification.

== Generalisations ==
Periodic minimal surfaces can be constructed in S^{3} and H^{3}.

It is possible to generalise the division of space into labyrinths to find triply periodic (but possibly branched) minimal surfaces that divide space into more than two sub-volumes.

Quasiperiodic minimal surfaces have been constructed in $\mathbb{R}^2 \times \textbf{S}^1$. It has been suggested but not been proven that minimal surfaces with a quasicrystalline order in $\mathbb{R}^3$ exist.

== See also ==
- Gyroid
- Lidinoid
- Schwarz minimal surface

== External galleries of images ==
- TPMS at the Minimal Surface Archive
- Periodic minimal surfaces gallery
