= Lidinoid =

Triply periodic minimal surface

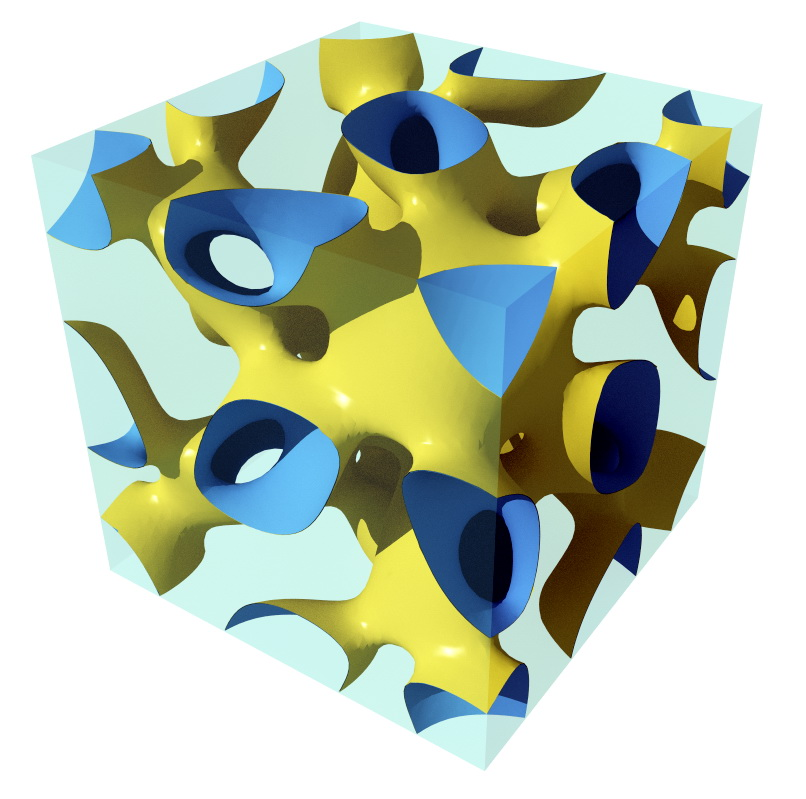
Lidinoid in a unit cell.

In differential geometry, the lidinoid is a triply periodic minimal surface. The name comes from its Swedish discoverer Sven Lidin (who called it the HG surface).

It has many similarities to the gyroid, and just as the gyroid is the unique embedded member of the associate family of the Schwarz P surface the lidinoid is the unique embedded member of the associate family of a Schwarz H surface. It belongs to space group 230(Ia3d).

The Lidinoid can be approximated as a level set:

$$\begin{align}
(1/2)[&\sin(2x) \cos(y)\sin(z)\\
+ &\sin(2y)\cos(z) \sin(x)\\
+ &\sin(2z)\cos(x) \sin(y)]\\
-& (1/2)[\cos(2x)\cos(2y)\\
+ &\cos(2y)\cos(2z)\\
+ &\cos(2z)\cos(2x)]  + 0.15 = 0
\end{align}$$

== See also ==
- Gyroid
- Schwarz minimal surface
- Triply periodic minimal surface

== External images ==
- The lidinoid at the minimal surface archive
- The lidinoid in the Scientific Graphic Project
