= Heptadecahedron =

Polyhedron with 17 faces

A heptadecahedron (or heptakaidecahedron) is a polyhedron with 17 faces. No heptadecahedron is regular; hence, the name is ambiguous. There are heptadecahedra which are nearly spherical, like those seen in some chemical structures, however their faces are not composed of regular polygons. There also exist heptadecahedra made up of regular polygons, such as the pentagonal rotunda and augmented sphenocorona, but their symmetry is low. In addition, there are numerous topologically distinct forms of a heptadecahedron; for example, the hexadecagonal pyramid and pentadecagonal prism.

In industry, heptadecahedra have many uses. For example, specially-designed heptadecahdra can help reduce empty space and make stacking more convenient.

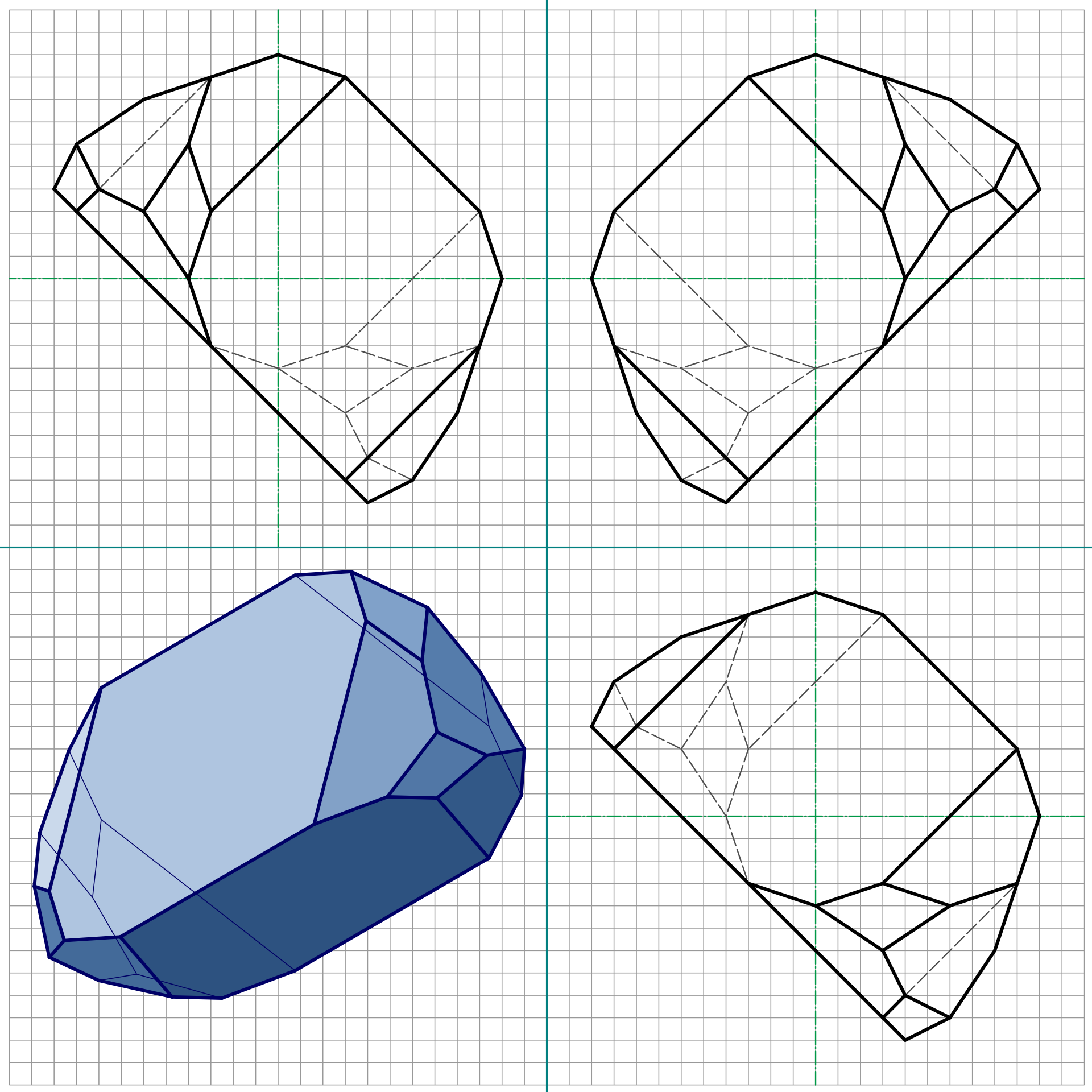
The heptadecahedron that tiles space in the Voronoi diagram of the Laves graph.

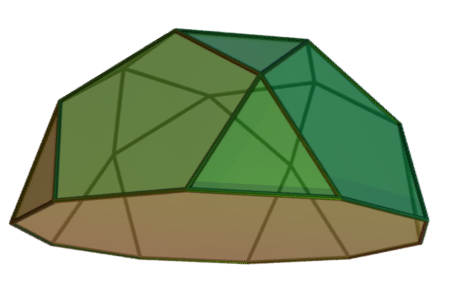
Pentagonal rotunda, the sixth Johnson solid $J_6$

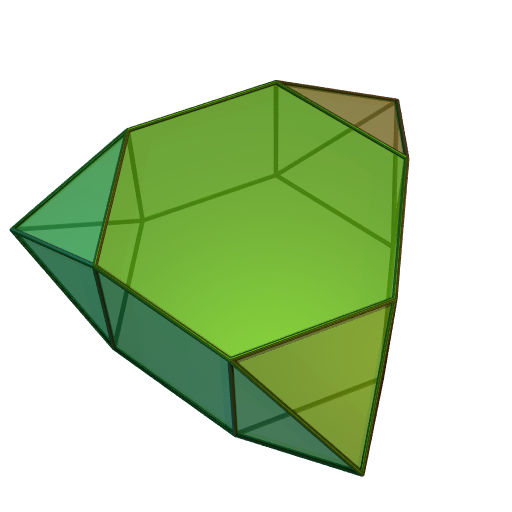
Triaugmented hexagonal prism, the fifty-seventh Johnson solid $J_{57}$

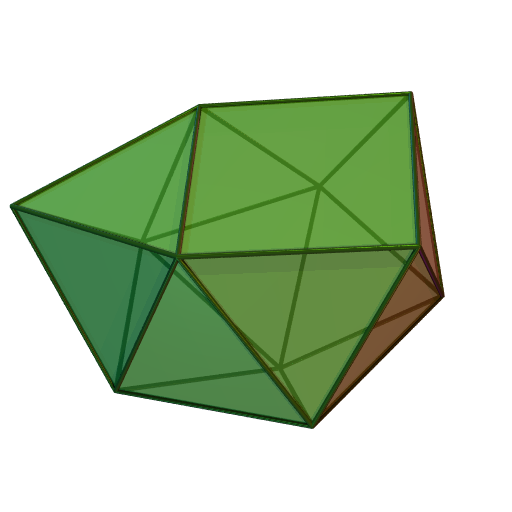
Augmented sphenocorona, the eighty-seventh Johnson solid $J_{87}$

== Convex heptadecahedra ==
There are 6,415,851,530,241 topologically distinct convex heptadecahedra, excluding mirror images, having at least 11 vertices. (Two polyhedra are "topologically distinct" if they have intrinsically different arrangements of faces and vertices, such that it is impossible to distort one into the other simply by changing the lengths of edges or the angles between edges or faces.)

The infinite Laves graph has convex heptadecahedral Voronoi cells. Because of the symmetries of the graph, these heptadecahedra are plesiohedra and form an isohedral tessellation of three-dimensional space.

Other convex polyhedra with 17 faces are the Johnson solids pentagonal rotunda, triaugmented hexagonal prism, and augmented sphenocorona.

== Non-convex heptadecahedra ==
There are also many non-convex heptadecahedra, such as star-shaped prisms, cones, or truncated prisms.

== Common heptadecahedra ==
=== Pentadecagonal prism ===
Pentadecagonal prism

A pentadecagonal prism is a prism with a pentadecagon base. It consists of 17 faces, 45 edges, and 30 vertices. A regular pentadecagonal prism is one whose faces are all regular polygons. Each vertex is a common vertex of 2 squares and 1 pentadecagon, and its vertex configuration is $4{.}4{.}15$, and therefore has the property of being isogonal and can be classified as a semi-regular heptadecahedron.

In Schläfli notation, it can be denoted as {15}×{} or t{2,15}, and its Coxeter-Dynkin diagram is given by; its Wythoff symbol is 2 15 | 2, and in Conway polyhedron notation it is represented by P15.

If the pentadecagonal prism has base side length $s$ and height $h$, then its volume $V$ and surface area $S$ is given by:

$$V=\frac{15 h s^2 \cot{\frac{\pi}{15}}}{4}\approx 17.6424 h s^2$$
$$S=15s\left(h+\frac{s\cot{\frac{\pi}{15}}}{2}\right)\approx 15s\left(h+2.35232s\right)$$

=== Hexadecagonal pyramid ===
Hexadecagonal pyramid

A hexadecagonal pyramid is a pyramid with a hexadecagon base. It consists of 17 faces, 32 edges, and 17 vertices. Its dual polyhedron is itself. A regular hexadecagonal pyramid is one whose base is a regular hexadecagon. In Schläfli notation, it can be denoted as {}∨{16}.

If the hexadecagonal pyramid has base side length $s$ and height $h$, then its volume $V$ and surface area $S$ is given by:

$$V=\frac{4 h s^2 \cot{\frac{\pi}{16}}}{3}\approx 6.70312 h s^2$$
$$S=4s\left(\sqrt{4h^2+s^2\cot^{2}{\frac{\pi}{16}}}+s\cot{\frac{\pi}{16}}\right)\approx 4s\left(\sqrt{4h^2+25.2741s^2}+5.02734s\right)$$

=== Elongated octagonal pyramid ===
Elongated octagonal pyramid

An elongated octagonal pyramid is formed by attaching an octagonal prism to an octagonal pyramid. It consists of 17 faces, 32 edges, and 17 vertices.

=== Pentagonal rotunda ===
Pentagonal rotunda

A pentagonal rotunda is a rotunda with a pentagon as its base. It consists of 17 faces, 35 edges and 20 vertices. Its 17 faces consist of 1 pentagon top, 1 decagon base, 5 pentagon sides, and 10 triangle sides.

A regular pentagon rotunda is one whose base is a regular pentagon. It has regular pentagons on both its top and side faces. All faces of this polyhedron are regular polygons. It is therefore a Johnson solid, and is the only rotunda that belongs in the Johnson group.

The symmetry group of the pentagonal rotunda is C_{5v}, and its order is 10.

=== Triangular cupolarotunda ===
A triangular cupolarotunda is formed by joining a triangular cupola and a triangular rotunda with the base having more edges. It consists of 17 faces, 30 edges, and 15 vertices. Its 17 faces consist of 2 triangle bases, 9 triangle sides, 3 rectangle sides, and 3 pentagon sides.

The triangular cupolarotunda can be either ortho- or gyro- depending on how the cupola and rotunda are joined.

| Triangular orthocupolarotunda | Triangular gyrocupolarotunda |

=== List of common heptadecahedra ===
| Name | Image | Symbol | V | E | F | χ | Faces | Symmetry | Expanded view |
|---|---|---|---|---|---|---|---|---|---|
| Pentadecagonal prism | | t{2,15} {15}x{} | 30 | 45 | 17 | 2 | 2 pentadecagons 15 rectangles | D_{15h}, [15,2], (*15 2 2), order 60 | |
| Hexadecagonal pyramid | | ( )∨{16} | 17 | 32 | 17 | 2 | 1 hexadecagon 16 triangles | C_{16v}, [16], (*16 16) | |
| Elongated octagonal pyramid | | P8+Y8 | 17 | 32 | 17 | 2 | 8 triangles 8 squares 1 octagon | C_{8v}, [8], (*88) | |
| Truncated octagonal bipyramid | | | 17 | 32 | 17 | 2 | 1 octagon 8 trapezoids 8 triangles | C_{8v}, [8], (*88) | |
| Pentadecagonal frustum | | | 30 | 45 | 17 | 2 | 2 pentadecagons 15 trapezoids | D_{15h}, [15,2], (*15 2 2), order 60 | |
| Pentagonal rotunda | | | 20 | 35 | 17 | 2 | 1 pentagon top 1 decagon base 5 pentagon sides 10 triangle sides | C_{5v}, [5], (*55), order 10 | |
| Triaugmented hexagonal prism | | | 30 | 15 | 17 | 2 | 12 triangles 3 squares 2 hexagons | D_{3h} | |
| Augmented sphenocorona | | | 26 | 11 | 17 | 2 | 16 triangles 1 square | C_{s} | |
| Triangular orthocupolarotunda | | | 15 | 30 | 17 | 2 | 2 triangle bases 9 triangle sides 3 rectangle sides 3 pentagon sides | C_{3v} | |
| Triangular gyrocupolarotunda | | | 15 | 30 | 17 | 2 | 2 triangle bases 9 triangle sides 3 rectangle sides 3 pentagon sides | C_{3v} | |
