= Schwarz minimal surface =

Periodic minimal surface

In differential geometry, the Schwarz minimal surfaces are periodic minimal surfaces originally described by Hermann Schwarz.

In the 1880s Schwarz and his student E. R. Neovius described periodic minimal surfaces. They were later named by Alan Schoen in his seminal report that described the gyroid and other triply periodic minimal surfaces.

The surfaces were generated using symmetry arguments: given a solution to Plateau's problem for a polygon, reflections of the surface across the boundary lines also produce valid minimal surfaces that can be continuously joined to the original solution. If a minimal surface meets a plane at right angles, then the mirror image in the plane can also be joined to the surface. Hence given a suitable initial polygon inscribed in a unit cell periodic surfaces can be constructed.

The Schwarz surfaces have topological genus 3, the minimal genus of triply periodic minimal surfaces.

They have been considered as models for periodic nanostructures in block copolymers, electrostatic equipotential surfaces in crystals, and hypothetical negatively curved graphite phases.

== Schwarz P ("Primitive") ==
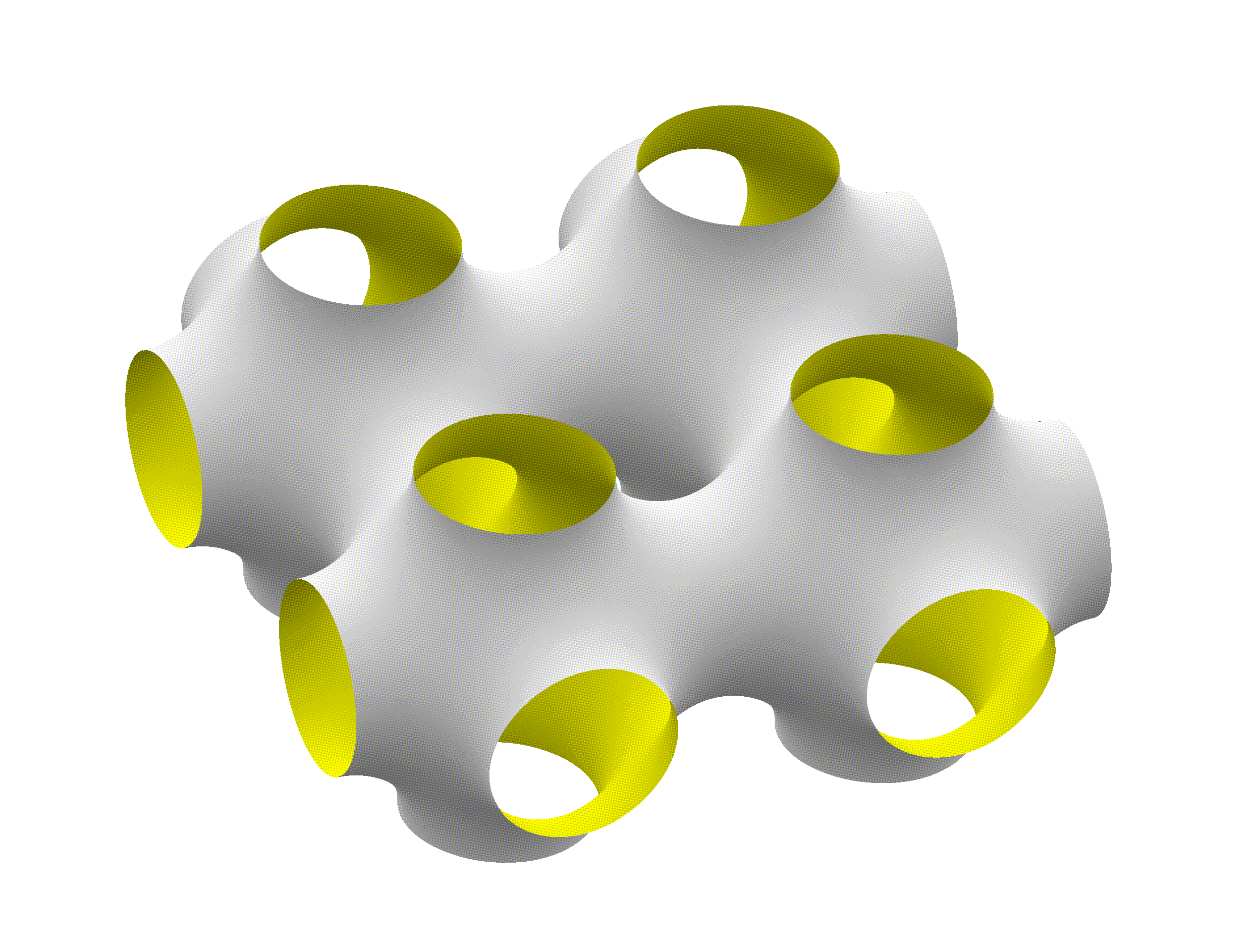
Schwarz P surface

Schoen named this surface 'primitive' because it has two intertwined congruent labyrinths, each with the shape of an inflated tubular version of the simple cubic lattice. While the standard P surface has cubic symmetry the unit cell can be any rectangular box, producing a family of minimal surfaces with the same topology.

It can be approximated by the implicit surface

$\cos(x) + \cos(y) + \cos(z) = 0 \$.

The P surface has been considered for prototyping tissue scaffolds with a high surface-to-volume ratio and porosity.

== Schwarz D ("Diamond") ==
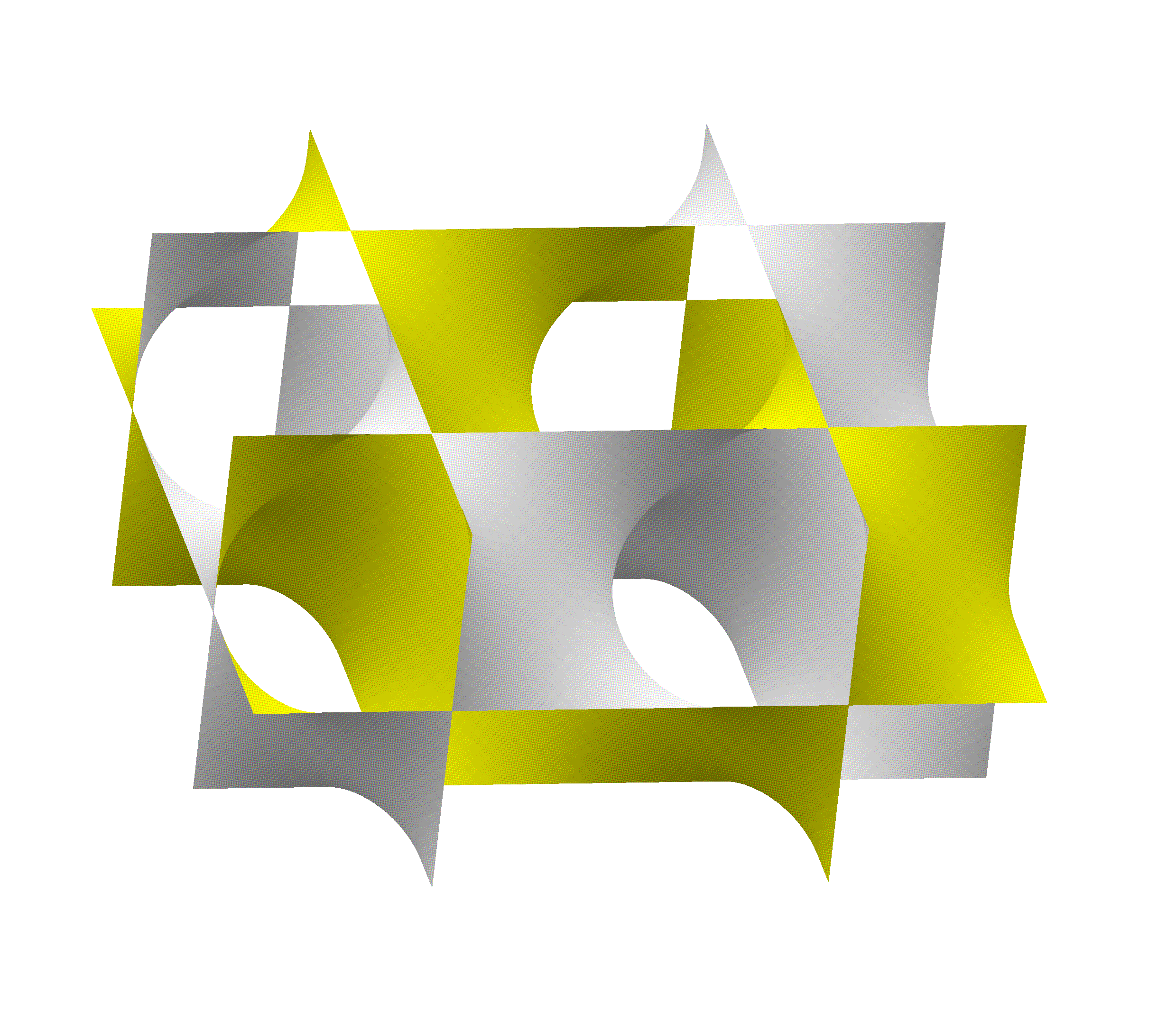
Schwarz D surface

Schoen named this surface 'diamond' because it has two intertwined congruent labyrinths, each having the shape of an inflated tubular version of the diamond bond structure. It is sometimes called the F surface in the literature.

It can be approximated by the implicit surface

$$\cos(x)\cos(y)\cos(z) - \sin(x)\sin(y)\sin(z) = 0\$$.

Some sources give the alternate implicit surface

$$\sin(x)\sin(y)\sin(z) + \sin(x)\cos(y)\cos(z) + \cos(x)\sin(y)\cos(z) + \cos(x)\cos(y)\sin(z) = 0$$

which is equivalent up to a translation in all coordinates by $\frac{\pi}{4}$.

An exact expression exists in terms of elliptic integrals, based on the Weierstrass representation.

== Schwarz H ("Hexagonal") ==
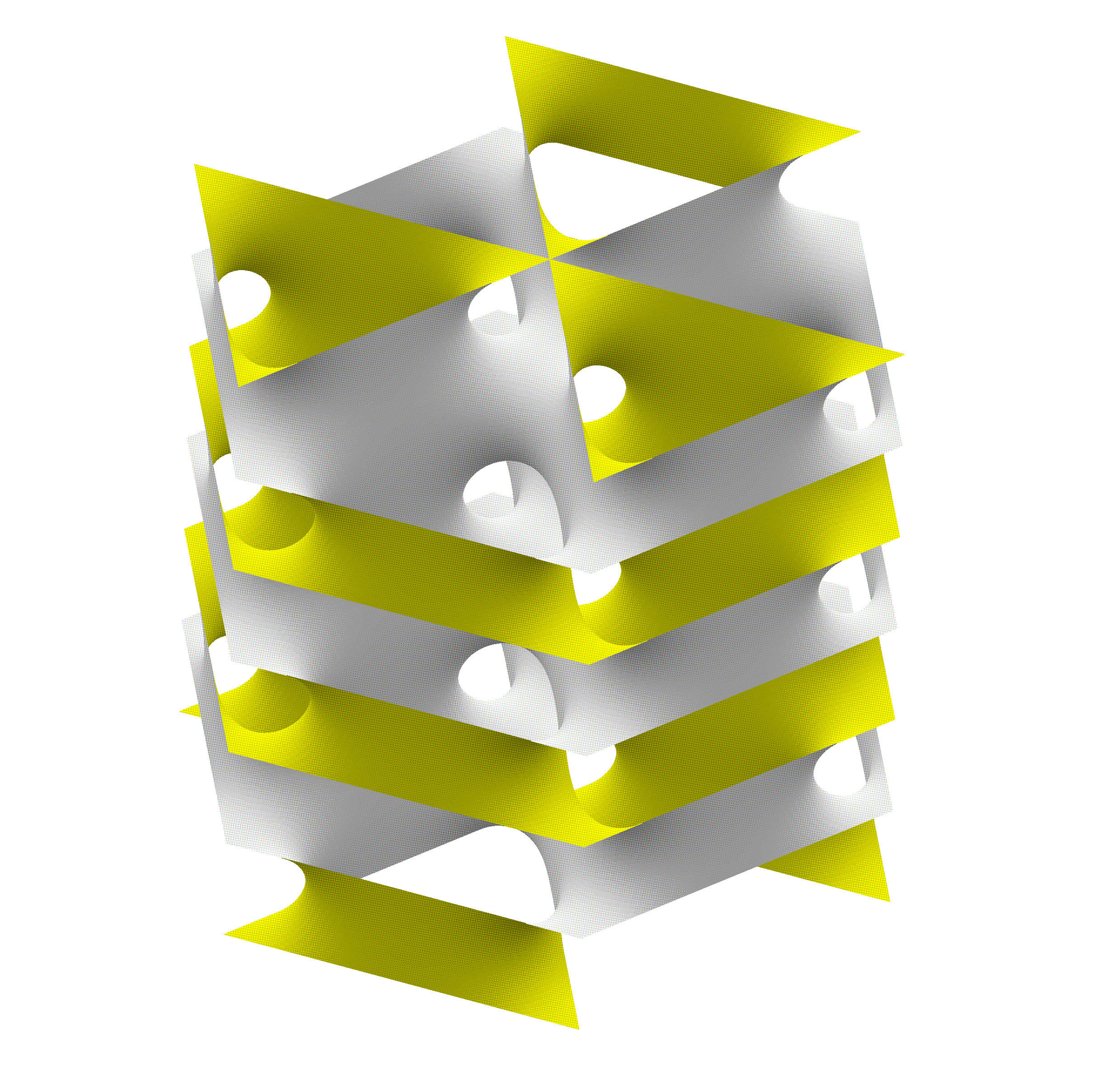
Schwarz H surface

The H surface is similar to a catenoid with a triangular boundary, allowing it to tile space.

== Schwarz CLP ("Crossed layers of parallels") ==
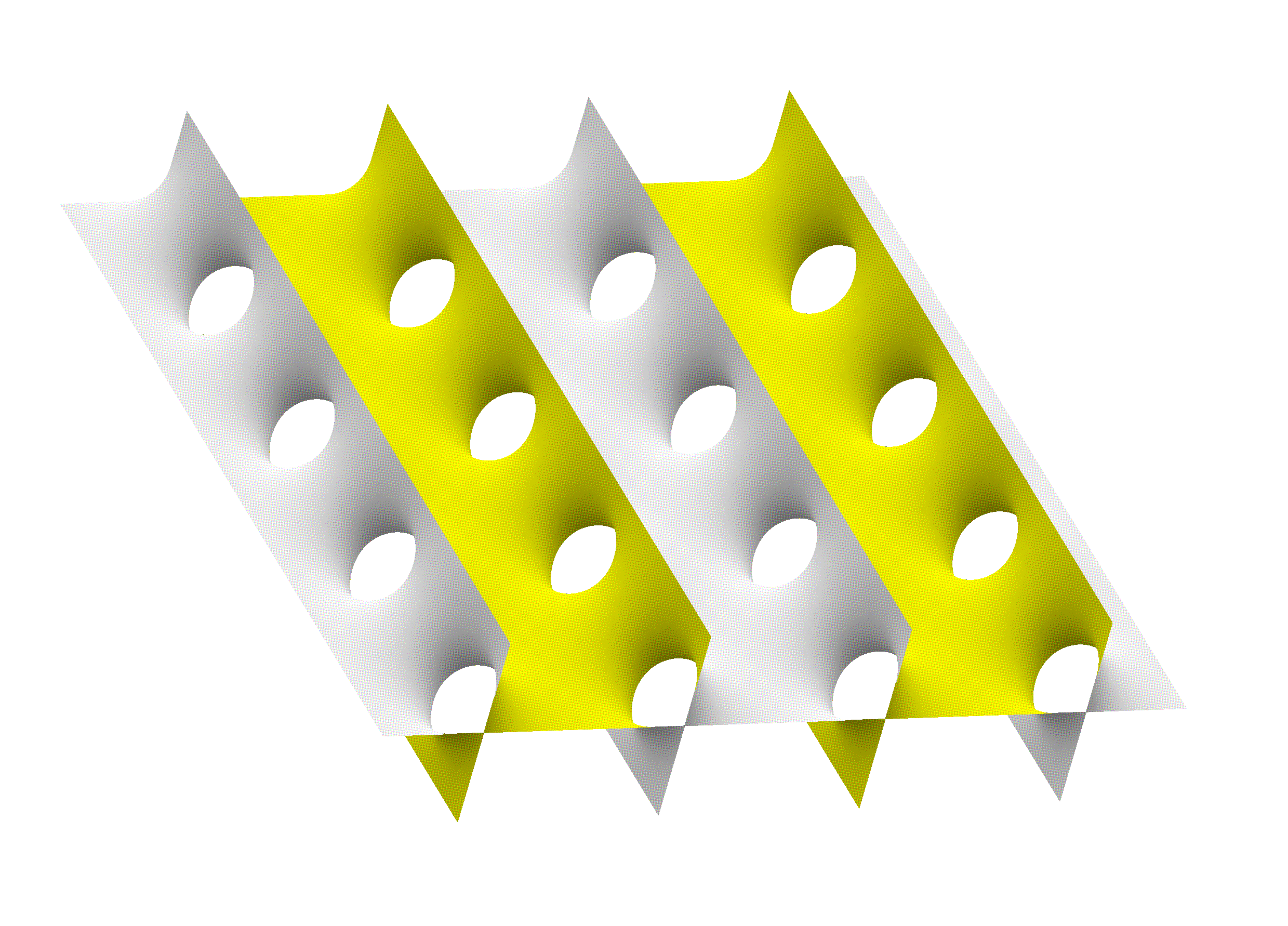
Schwarz CLP surface

== Illustrations ==
- Susquehanna University - Triply Periodic Minimal Surfaces (Archived)
- Indiana University - Triply Periodic Surfaces of Genus 3 (Archived)
- Ruprecht-Karls-Universität Heidelberg - Bicontinuous cubic phases based on triply periodic minimal surfaces
- Université libre de Bruxelles - Schwartz's Surface (Archived)
- Virtual Math Museum - 3DXM Minimal Surface Gallery

== See also ==
- Gyroid
- Lidinoid
- Triply periodic minimal surface
