= Gyroid =

Infinitely connected triply periodic minimal surface

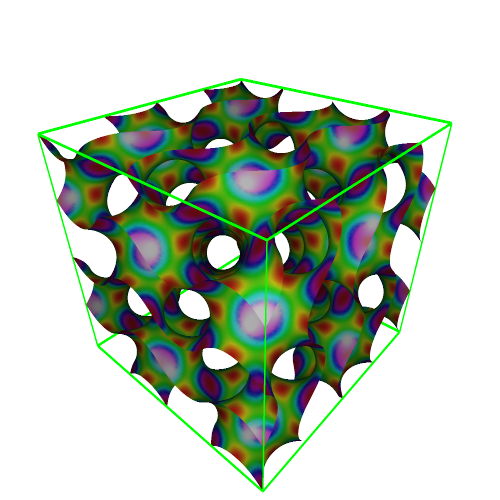
A gyroid minimal surface, coloured to show the Gaussian curvature at each point

3D model of a gyroid unit cell

A gyroid is an infinitely connected triply periodic minimal surface discovered by Alan Schoen in 1970. It arises naturally in polymer science and biology, as an interface with high surface area.

== History and properties ==
The gyroid is the unique non-trivial embedded member of the associate family of the Schwarz P and D surfaces. Its angle of association with respect to the D surface is approximately 38.01°. The gyroid is similar to the lidinoid.

The gyroid was discovered in 1970 by NASA scientist Alan Schoen. He calculated the angle of association and gave a convincing demonstration of pictures of intricate plastic models, but did not provide a proof of embeddedness. Schoen noted that the gyroid contains neither straight lines nor planar symmetries. Karcher gave a different, more contemporary treatment of the surface in 1989 using conjugate surface construction. In 1996 Große-Brauckmann and Wohlgemuth proved that it is embedded, and in 1997 Große-Brauckmann provided CMC (constant mean curvature) variants of the gyroid and made further numerical investigations about the volume fractions of the minimal and CMC gyroids.

The gyroid separates space into two oppositely congruent labyrinths of passages. The gyroid has space group $I4_{1}32$ (no. 214), if those labyrinths are considered inequivalent, and $Ia\bar{3}d$ if both sides are equivalent. Channels run through the gyroid labyrinths in the (100) and (111) directions; passages emerge at 70.5 degree angles to any given channel as it is traversed, the direction at which they do so gyrating down the channel, giving rise to the name "gyroid". One way to visualize the surface is to picture the "square catenoids" of the P surface (formed by two squares in parallel planes, with a nearly circular waist); rotation about the edges of the square generate the P surface. In the associate family, these square catenoids "open up" (similar to the way the catenoid "opens up" to a helicoid) to form gyrating ribbons, then finally become the Schwarz D surface. For one value of the associate family parameter the gyrating ribbons lie in precisely the locations required to have an embedded surface.

The gyroid refers to the member that is in the associate family of the Schwarz P surface, but in fact the gyroid exists in several families that preserve various symmetries of the surface; a more complete discussion of families of these minimal surfaces appears in triply periodic minimal surfaces.

Like some other triply periodic minimal surfaces, the gyroid surface can be trigonometrically approximated by a short equation:

$$\sin x\cos y+\sin y\cos z+\sin z\cos x=0$$

The gyroid structure is closely related to the K_{4} crystal (Laves' graph of girth ten).

== Applications ==
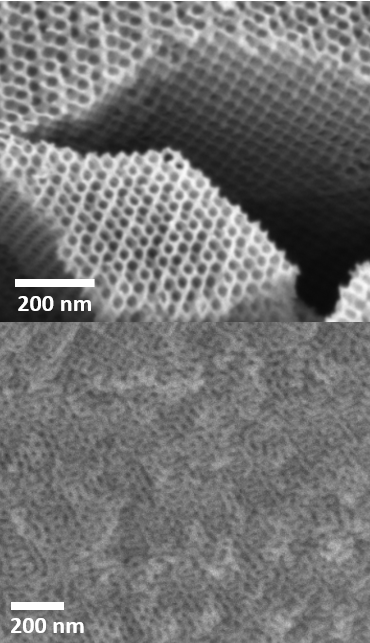
SEM micrograph of TiO_{2} alternating gyroid nanostructure (top) and Ta_{2}O_{5} double gyroid nanostructure (bottom).

In nature, self-assembled gyroid structures are found in certain surfactant or lipid mesophases and block copolymers. In a typical A-B diblock copolymer phase diagram, the gyroid phase can be formed at intermediate volume fractions between the lamellar and cylindrical phases. In A-B-C block copolymers, the double and alternating-gyroid phases can be formed. Such self-assembled polymer structures have found applications in experimental supercapacitors, solar cells photocatalysts, and nanoporous membranes. Gyroid membrane structures are occasionally found inside cells. Gyroid structures have photonic band gaps that make them potential photonic crystals. Single gyroid photonic crystals have been observed in biological structural coloration such as butterfly wing scales and bird feathers, inspiring work on biomimetic materials. The gyroid mitochondrial membranes found in the retinal cone cells of certain tree shrew species present a unique structure which may have an optical function.

In 2017, MIT researchers studied the possibility of using the gyroid shape to turn bi-dimensional materials, such as graphene, into a three-dimensional structural material with low density, yet high tensile strength.

Researchers from Cambridge University have shown the controlled chemical vapor deposition of sub–60 nm graphene gyroids. These interwoven structures are one of the smallest free-standing graphene 3D structures. They are conductive, mechanically stable, and easily transferable, and are of interest for a wide range of applications.

The gyroid pattern has also found use in 3D printing for lightweight internal structures, due to its high strength, combined with speed and ease of printing using an FDM 3D printer.

In a study in silico, researchers from the university hospital Charité in Berlin investigated the potential of gyroid architecture when used as a scaffold in a large bone defect in a rat femur. When comparing the regenerated bone within a gyroid scaffold compared to a traditional strut-like scaffold, they found that gyroid scaffolds led to less bone formation and attributed this reduced bone formation to the gyroid architecture hindering cell penetration.

In the shoulder of the wings of blue-winged leafbirds (Chloropsis moluccensis), gyroid crystals cause a very special-looking mesh of blue hues due to interference patterns. It is the only known species that has this adaptation.

== See also ==
- Lidinoid
- Schwarz minimal surface
- Triply periodic minimal surface
