= Diamond cubic =

Type of crystal structure

Rotating model of the diamond cubic crystal structure

3D ball-and-stick model of a diamond lattice

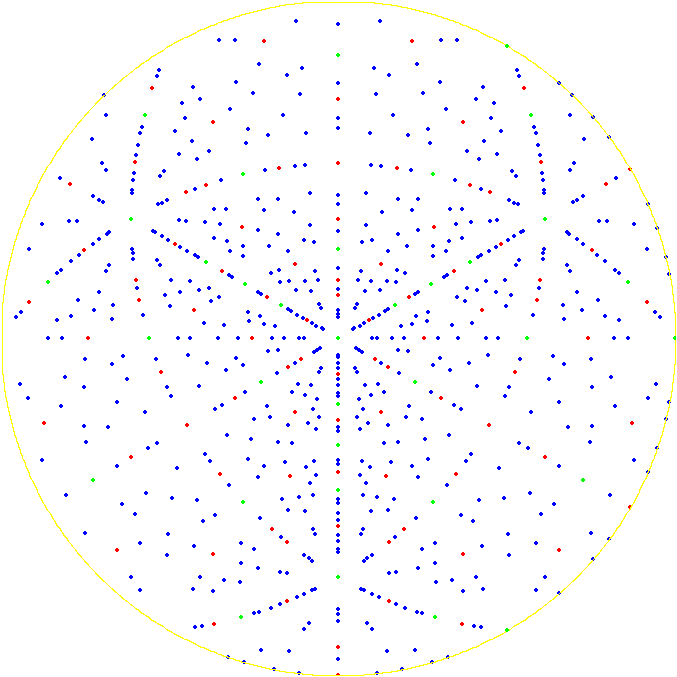
Pole figure in stereographic projection of the diamond lattice showing the 3-fold symmetry along the [111] direction

In crystallography, the diamond cubic crystal structure is a repeating pattern of 8 atoms that certain materials may adopt as they solidify. While the first known example was diamond, other elements in group 14 also adopt this structure, including α-tin, the semiconductors silicon and germanium, and silicon–germanium alloys in any proportion. There are also crystals, such as the high-temperature form of cristobalite, which have a similar structure, with one kind of atom (such as silicon in cristobalite) at the positions of carbon atoms in diamond but with another kind of atom (such as oxygen) halfway between those (see Category:Minerals in space group 227).

Although often called the diamond lattice, this structure is not a lattice in the technical sense of this word used in mathematics.

== Crystallographic structure ==
Visualisation of a diamond cubic unit cell: 1. Components of a unit cell, 2. One unit cell, 3. A lattice of 3 × 3 × 3 unit cells

Diamond's cubic structure is in the Fd3̅m space group (space group 227), which follows the face-centered cubic Bravais lattice. The lattice describes the repeat pattern; for diamond cubic crystals this lattice is "decorated" with a motif of two tetrahedrally bonded atoms in each primitive cell, separated by 1/4 of the width of the unit cell in each dimension. The diamond lattice can be viewed as a pair of intersecting face-centered cubic lattices, with each separated by 1/4 of the width of the unit cell in each dimension. Many compound semiconductors such as gallium arsenide, β-silicon carbide, and indium antimonide adopt the analogous zincblende structure, where each atom has nearest neighbors of an unlike element. Zincblende's space group is F4̅3m, but many of its structural properties are quite similar to the diamond structure.

The atomic packing factor of the diamond cubic structure (the proportion of space that would be filled by spheres that are centered on the vertices of the structure and are as large as possible without overlapping) is $\tfrac{\pi\sqrt 3}{16} \approx 0.34,$ significantly smaller (indicating a less dense structure) than the packing factors for the face-centered and body-centered cubic lattices. Zincblende structures have higher packing factors than 0.34 depending on the relative sizes of their two component atoms.

The first-, second-, third-, fourth-, and fifth-nearest-neighbor distances in units of the cubic lattice constant are $\tfrac{\sqrt 3}{4}, \tfrac{\sqrt 2}{2}, \tfrac{\sqrt{11}}{4}, 1, \tfrac{\sqrt{19}}{4},$ respectively.

== Mathematical structure ==
Mathematically, the points of the diamond cubic structure can be given coordinates as a subset of a three-dimensional integer lattice by using a cubic unit cell four units across. With these coordinates, the points of the structure have coordinates (x, y, z) satisfying the equations
$$\begin{align}
x = y &= z\ (\text{mod }\ 2), \\
x + y + z &= 0 \text{ or } 1\ (\text{mod }\ 4).
\end{align}$$

There are eight points (modulo 4) that satisfy these conditions:

(0,0,0), (0,2,2), (2,0,2), (2,2,0),
(3,3,3), (3,1,1), (1,3,1), (1,1,3)

All of the other points in the structure may be obtained by adding multiples of four to the x, y, z coordinates of these eight points. Adjacent points in this structure are at distance $\sqrt 3$ apart in the integer lattice; the edges of the diamond structure lie along the body diagonals of the integer grid cubes. This structure may be scaled to a cubical unit cell that is some number a of units across by multiplying all coordinates by a/4.

Alternatively, each point of the diamond cubic structure may be given by four-dimensional integer coordinates whose sum is either zero or one. Two points are adjacent in the diamond structure if and only if their four-dimensional coordinates differ by one in a single coordinate. The total difference in coordinate values between any two points (their four-dimensional Manhattan distance) gives the number of edges in the shortest path between them in the diamond structure. The four nearest neighbors of each point may be obtained, in this coordinate system, by adding one to each of the four coordinates, or by subtracting one from each of the four coordinates, accordingly as the coordinate sum is zero or one. These four-dimensional coordinates may be transformed into three-dimensional coordinates by the formula $(a,b,c,d) \to (a+b-c-d,\ a-b+c-d,\ -a+b+c-d).$ Because the diamond structure forms a distance-preserving subset of the four-dimensional integer lattice, it is a partial cube.

Yet another coordinatization of the diamond cubic involves the removal of some of the edges from a three-dimensional grid graph. In this coordinatization, which has a distorted geometry from the standard diamond cubic structure but has the same topological structure, the vertices of the diamond cubic are represented by all possible 3d grid points and the edges of the diamond cubic are represented by a subset of the 3d grid edges.

The diamond cubic is sometimes called the "diamond lattice" but it is not, mathematically, a lattice: there is no translational symmetry that takes the point (0,0,0) into the point (3,3,3), for instance. However, it is still a highly symmetric structure: any incident pair of a vertex and edge can be transformed into any other incident pair by a congruence of Euclidean space. Moreover, the diamond crystal as a network in space has a strong isotropic property. Namely, for any two vertices x, y of the crystal net, and for any ordering of the edges adjacent to x and any ordering of the edges adjacent to y, there is a net-preserving congruence taking x to y and each x-edge to the similarly ordered y-edge. Another (hypothetical) crystal with this property is the Laves graph (also called the K_{4} crystal, (10,3)-a, or the diamond twin).

== Mechanical properties ==
The compressive strength and hardness of diamond and various other materials, such as boron nitride, (which has the closely related zincblende structure) is attributed to the diamond cubic structure.

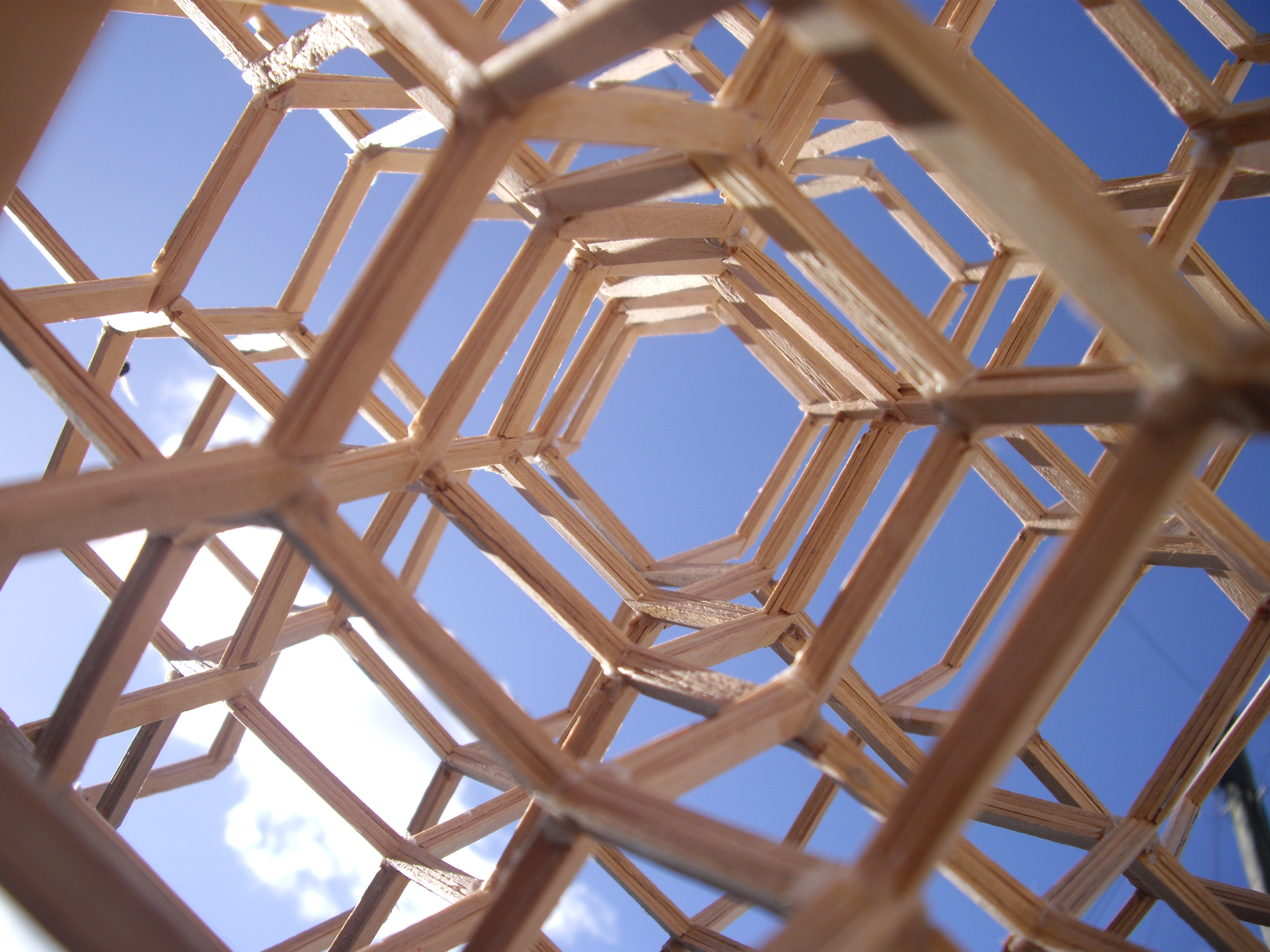
Example of a diamond cubic truss system for resisting compression

Similarly, truss systems that follow the diamond cubic geometry have a high capacity to withstand compression, by minimizing the unbraced length of individual struts. The diamond cubic geometry has also been considered for the purpose of providing structural rigidity though structures composed of skeletal triangles, such as the octet truss, have been found to be more effective for this purpose.

== See also ==
- Allotropes of carbon – Materials made only out of carbon
- Crystallography – Scientific study of crystal structures
- Laves graph – Periodic spatial graph
- Triakis truncated tetrahedral honeycomb – Space-filling tessellation
