= Alan Schoen =

American physicist (1924–2023)

- Born: Alan Hugh Schoen; December 11, 1924; Mount Vernon, New York, U.S.
- Died: July 26, 2023 (aged 98); Carbondale, Illinois. U.S.
- Education: Yale University, University of Illinois Urbana-Champaign
- Known for: Gyroid, Rombix
- Scientific career
- Fields: Physicist
- Workplaces: NASA, Southern Illinois University Carbondale
- Thesis: Self-diffusion in alpha solid solutions of silver-cadmium and silver-indium (1958)
- Doctoral advisor: David Lazarus

Alan Hugh Schoen (December 11, 1924 – July 26, 2023) was an American physicist and computer scientist best known for his discovery of the gyroid, an infinitely connected triply periodic minimal surface.

== Professional career ==
Alan Schoen received his B.S. degree in physics from Yale University in 1945, followed by his M.S. and Ph.D. in physics from University of Illinois at Urbana-Champaign in 1951 and 1958, respectively. His doctoral dissertation was entitled “Self-Diffusion in Alpha Solid Solutions of Silver-Cadmium and Silver-Indium.” After completing graduate work he was employed (between 1957 and 1967) as a research physicist by aerospace companies in California, and also worked as a free-lance solid-state physics consultant. In 1967, he took the position of senior scientist at NASA's Electronics Research Center (ERC) in Cambridge, Massachusetts, where he did geometry research and served as the Chief of the Office of Geometrical Applications. While at NASA, he also worked on expandable space frames. In 1970, Schoen accepted a position at California Institute of the Arts, where he taught calculus and computer graphics. In 1973, he accepted a teaching position in the Department of Design at Southern Illinois University Carbondale (SIUC), where he taught computer graphics, algebra, and analytic geometry to design students. This was a former home department of Buckminster Fuller - an American designer and inventor who popularized the geodesic dome. In 1982, Schoen accepted a joint appointment in the Department of Mathematics and Department of Computer Science at SIUC. In August 1985, he moved to the SIUC campus in Nakajo, Japan, where he taught a course in computer science and also helped to teach English at a local Japanese junior high school. Upon his return to Carbondale in 1988, he taught FORTRAN and Digital Design in the Electrical Engineering Department at SIUC until his retirement in 1995.

After retiring from academia he continued his work on numerous infinite families of minimal surfaces and on inventing geometric puzzles and images. He was active in the early days of the recreational math conference called Gathering 4 Gardner.

== Contributions ==
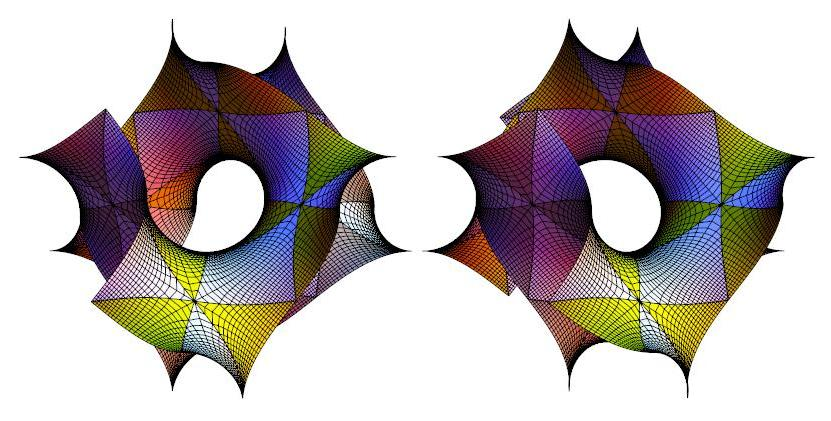
Stereo image of gyroid unit cell by Alan Schoen (2014)

Alan Schoen is best known for discovering (while working at NASA) a minimal surface that he named the gyroid. The name stems from the impression in the gyroid's structure that each continuous channel in the array, along different principal crystallographic axes, has connections to additional intersecting channels, which “gyrate” along the channel length. The gyroid has become popular among scientists as more and more new occurrences of it in nature are being discovered. Earlier in his career, while conducting his doctoral research on atomic diffusion in solids (1957), Schoen discovered that for self-diffusion in crystalline solids, there is a simple relation between the Bardeen-Hering correlation factor and the isotope effect that makes it possible to distinguish between vacancy and interstitial diffusion mechanisms. He later found evidence from a FORTRAN program that his equation is exact in all close-packed cubic structures. His finding was soon confirmed algebraically by Tharmalingam and Lidiard. Schoen's preoccupation with this subject eventually led him to an interest in minimal surfaces and the discovery of the gyroid.

Schoen also published scientific papers on families of minimal surfaces, and books on geometric images and puzzles. In the early 1990s, Schoen designed Rombix — a combinatorial dissection puzzle, which uses multicolored tiles that are composites of 8-zonogons, to create various designs. He also developed The Geometry Garret, a website full of different families of geometric structures (considered "cool stuff" by Alan's academic colleagues). Alan Schoen held U.S. patents (see below) for six of his inventions.

== Death ==
Alan Schoen died in Carbondale, Illinois, on July 26, 2023, at the age of 98.

== Selected works ==
Schoen, Alan H. (1970) "Infinite periodic minimal surfaces without self-intersections." NASA Tech. Note No. D-5541. Washington, DC.

McSorley, John and Schoen, Alan. (2013) "Rhombic tilings of (n,k)-Ovals, (n,k,λ)-cyclic difference sets, and related topics." Discrete Mathematics 313, No. 1 (Jan 2013).

Ed Pegg, Alan H. Schoen, and Tom M. Rodgers. (2008) Homage to a pied puzzler. hardback — 325 pages, CRC Press/ Taylor and Francis Group. ISBN 1568813155. ISBN 978-1568813158

Ed Pegg, Alan H. Schoen, and Tom Rodgers (2009) Mathematical wizardry for a Gardner hardback — 220 pages, A K Peters ISBN 156881447X ISBN 978-1568814476

Schoen, Alan H. (2012) Reflections concerning triply-periodic minimal surfaces. Interface Focus 30 May 2012.

== Patents ==
Listing of U.S. patents issued to Alan H. Schoen:

- 1972 U.S. patent 3,663,346 Honeycomb core structures of minimal surface tubule sections
- 1972 U.S. patent 3,663,347 Honeycomb panels formed of minimal surface periodic tubule layers
- 1973 U.S. patent 3,757,476 Expandable space-frames
- 1994 U.S. patent 4,223,890 Set of tiles for covering a surface
- 1994 U.S. patent 5,314,183 Set of tiles for covering a surface
- 2001 U.S. patent 20,010,035,606 Set of blocks for packing a cube

== See also ==
- Gyroid
- List of physicists
