= Bainbridge Cinemas =

Movie theater in Bainbridge Island, Washington, United States

- Interactive map of Bainbridge Cinemas
- Address: 403 Madison Ave N # 101, Bainbridge Island, Washington; United States of America
- Coordinates: 47.6274°N 122.5215°W
- Owner: Far Away Entertainment
- Screen: 5
- Current use: Film

Website
- www.farawayentertainment.com/locations/bainbridge-cinemas

Bainbridge Cinemas is a movie theater located on Bainbridge Island in Kitsap County, Washington. It is the largest movie theater complex located on Bainbridge Island.

== History ==
Bainbridge Cinemas was founded in the 1980s by Sam Granato and Jeff Brien, co-owners of the company Bainbridge Entertainment, which had earlier acquired the Lynwood Theatre in 1982. Granato, president of Bainbridge Entertainment and future first mayor of the city of Bainbridge Island, built and developed the Bainbridge Island Pavilion, which houses Bainbridge Cinemas. It is currently owned by Far Away Entertainment, though the building is owned by Madison Avenue Real Estate with the majority shareholder being John Eisenhauer.

During the 2020 pandemic, Bainbridge Cinemas hosted events for Bainbridge Performing Arts. Bainbridge Cinemas is a host venue for the Bainbridge Island Film Festival.
