= Charles Poekel =

American filmmaker and cinematographer

- Born: April 17, 1984 (age 42); Summit, New Jersey, U.S.
- Education: Goddard College; St. Lawrence University
- Occupations: Filmmaker, cinematographer
- Years active: 2009–present
- Website: www.charlespoekel.com

Charles Poekel (born April 17, 1984) is an American filmmaker and cinematographer known for his work in independent cinema.

== Career ==
Poekel made his directorial debut with Christmas, Again (2014), a feature inspired by his personal experience working at a Christmas tree stand in New York City. The film premiered at the Locarno Film Festival and the Sundance Film Festival, and was nominated for a John Cassavetes Award at the Independent Spirit Awards. Noted for blending semi-documentary realism with fiction, Christmas, Again helped establish Poekel's reputation for a style rooted in intimate storytelling, often featuring real-life locations and settings.

Poekel is currently the interim chair of film at Cornish College of the Arts in Seattle and director of the Bainbridge Island Film Festival.

== Filmography ==
Year	Title	Role	Notes
2009	All In: The Poker Movie	Cinematographer	
2011	Making the Boys	Cinematographer	Documentary about the play The Boys in the Band (and movie)
2011	Fake It So Real	Producer	
2014	Hey Bartender	Cinematographer	
2014	Uncle Floyd (short)	Director, Producer	
2014	Christmas, Again	Director, Writer, Producer	Premiered at Locarno and Sundance
2015	Drunk Stoned Brilliant Dead	Cinematographer	Documentary about National Lampoon
2018	Tomnoddy (short)	Director	Documentary about bubble artist Tom Noddy
