= Christmas, Again =

- Theatrical release poster
- Directed by: Charles Poekel
- Written by: Charles Poekel
- Produced by: Charles Poekel
- Starring: Kentucker Audley; Hannah Gross
- Cinematography: Sean Price Williams
- Edited by: Robert Greene
- Release date: 12 August 2014 (Locarno)
- Running time: 80 minutes
- Language: English

Christmas, Again is a 2014 drama film written, directed, and produced by Charles Poekel. The film features Kentucker Audley in the lead role as a Christmas-tree salesman returning to New York City. The film had its premiere at the 2014 Locarno International Film Festival in Switzerland and also screened at 2015 Sundance Film Festival in the United States.

== Plot ==
Noel, a heartbroken Christmas-tree salesman, returns to New York City hoping to put his past behind him. Living in a trailer and working the night shift, he begins to spiral downwards until the saving of a mysterious woman and some colorful customers rescue him from self-destruction.

== Cast ==
- Kentucker Audley as Noel
- Hannah Gross as Lydia
- Craig Butta as Bluetooth Man
- Mario Cantillo as Nighttime Customer
- Heather Courtney as Pregnant Wife
- Martin Courtney as Husband on Crutches
- David Gauld as Wreath Guy
- Dakota Goldhor as Plain Wreath Customer
- Yvonne Gougelet as Obama Tree Lady

== Production ==
Writer-director Charles Poekel was himself a Christmas tree salesman and used his earnings to finance the film. The film was shot in 16 mm.

== Critical reception ==
The film currently holds a 100% approval rating on the review aggregator website Rotten Tomatoes, based on 21 critics' reviews.

Sheila O'Malley of RogerEbert.com gave the film 3 and 1/2 stars out of 4 and said "the most striking thing about it is its evocation of an extremely specific mood. Once we settle into it, and it happens early, everything else becomes possible." Alonso Duralde of TheWrap noted, "Delicate and restrained, the film offers the messages of redemption and renewal we so often crave from a Christmas movie without wrapping its themes and characters in tinsel."

=== Accolades ===
The film has been nominated for several independent film awards including the John Cassavetes Award at the 2016 Independent Spirit Awards.
