= Zubbles =

Colored soap bubbles

- Product type: Toy
- Produced by: Jamm Company
- Country: United States
- Introduced: 2009

Zubbles is a commercial name for colored soap bubbles.

Popular Science named Zubbles the "Innovation of the Year" for 2005. Reader's Digest agreed, saying they were one of the "Best Innovations" of the year in 2006.

== Development ==
Zubbles were invented by Tim Kehoe, a toy creator from St. Paul, Minnesota. After an unexplained breakthrough in his kitchen, he was able to produce blue bubbles, that, unsuitably for a toy, stained clothing. After an eight-year-long delay in developing the idea further, he recommenced his investigations after forming a new toy company.

In the process of trying to rediscover the recipe, he changed the formula, making the coloring water-soluble. However, having to wash off the color from the bubbles rendered them unsuited to a mass-market toy. Kehoe hired the dye chemist Ram Sabnis, who arrived at a formula where the color would disappear on its own, with sufficient exposure to air, and without washing or staining.

The company entered into a global license agreement with Spin Master Ltd. for Zubbles Colored Bubbles in December 2005. Despite announcements of expected release dates, Spin Master dropped plans for commercial production due to complexities in the manufacturing process.

In 2008, the company reached a licensing agreement with a new toy company called Jamm Company. Zubbles commenced commercial sales in June 2009.

In 2011, Crayola disputed the patent given to Kehoe/C2C Technologies in a lawsuit which claimed that colored bubbles should be in the public domain.

Kehoe died unexpectedly at the age of 43 in 2014.

== Process ==
The colored bubble solution uses special dyes called leuco dyes. For instance, the purple bubble uses a chemical called crystal violet lactone. After the bubble pops, the colored splatter disappears with friction, water or exposure to air.

In a normal soap bubble, surfactants reduce the surface tension of the water and allow the bubble to form. To create a colored bubble, dye molecules must bond to the surfactants. Each dye molecule in Zubbles is a structure known as a lactone ring. When the ring is closed, the molecule absorbs all visible light except for the color of the bubble. However, subjecting the lactone ring to air, water, or pressure causes the ring to open. This changes the molecule's structure to a straight chain which absorbs no visible light.

Lactone rings can be produced whenever a long chain molecule contains acid functionality on one end, and alcohol functionality at the other. The two ends of the molecule react in a condensation reaction, ejecting a water molecule. To drive the reaction back towards the long chain, pressure, heat or an excess of water must be added.
