= The Amazing Bubble Man =

Bubble artist and American entertainer

Louis Pearl
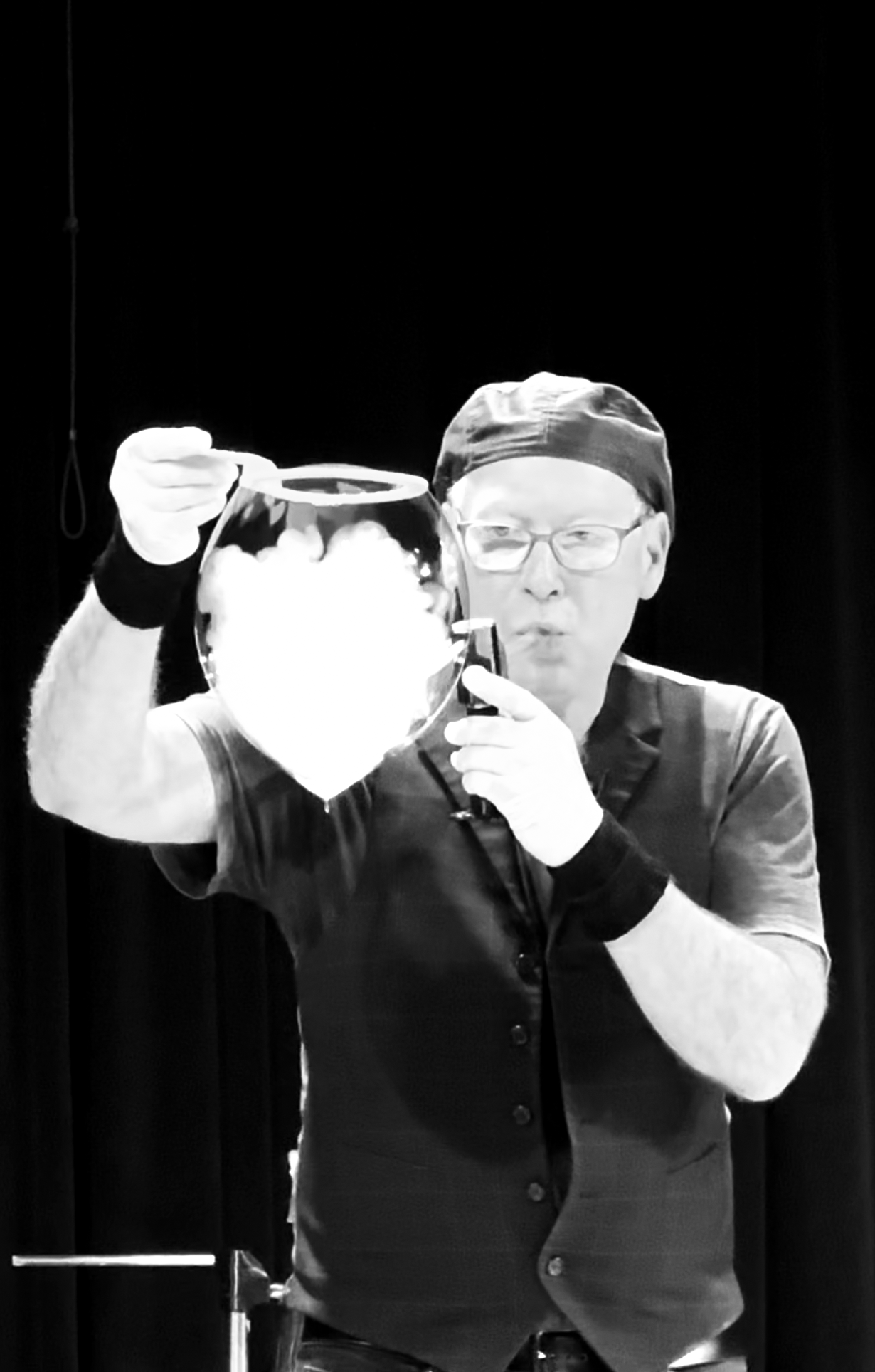
- Born: June 30, 1958 (age 67)
- Other names: The Amazing Bubble Man, The Pope of Soap
- Spouse: Jetty Swart
- Parent(s): Milton Pearl, Helen Pearl (nee Fisher)
- Website: https://amazingbubbleman.com/

Louis Pearl (born June 30, 1958), known as "The Amazing Bubble Man" or "Pope of Soap", is an American entertainer, bubble artist, entrepreneur, and author who performs shows with soap bubbles to global audiences.

Louis Pearl founded the company Tangent Toys in 1980, which was later acquired by a wholesale toy distributor in 2002. His show "The Amazing Bubble Man" has been performed across the world including in the US, China and the United Kingdom, where he has a long-running show at the Edinburgh Fringe.

== Early life and education ==
Louis was born in San Francisco in 1958. He grew up in the Richmond District on 26th Avenue and attended George Washington High School. His family attended Congregation Beth Sholom. His father, Milton Pearl, was chief of surgery and chief of staff at Mount Zion Hospital. Initially, Louis studied to follow in his father's footsteps. His father got Louis a summer position at their pathology department. Here Louis was fascinated by the artistic nature of viewing cells under a microscope. However, upon witnessing his first autopsy of the cadaver of Alan Watts, Louis decided not to pursue a medical profession.

Louis majored in English with a minor in art at University of California, San Diego. Here he became an assistant to graduate students studying local aquatic species at the Scripps Institution of Oceanography, a commitment which entailed scuba diving and studying fish populations. During this activity, he became fascinated with the bubbles he was exhaling and began to look at the air bubbles with a scientific curiosity.

While participating in a Dartmouth College-UCSD exchange program, he began to play with soap bubbles. Here he made movies, and experimented with filling them with smoke and shining lights on them in different ways.

In a college art class, during a mandated two minute performance he blew into a giant bubble using an Impala horn which would serve as inspiration for his future career.

== Personal life ==
Louis married the musician Jetty Swart (stage name Jet Black Pearl), who plays upbeat accordion music. They met while performing at the Fringe Festival in Edinburgh, Scotland. They live together in Portland, where they have lived since 2014.

Prior to living in Portland Louis has lived in Sebastapol, and a house boat in Sausalito.

== Career ==
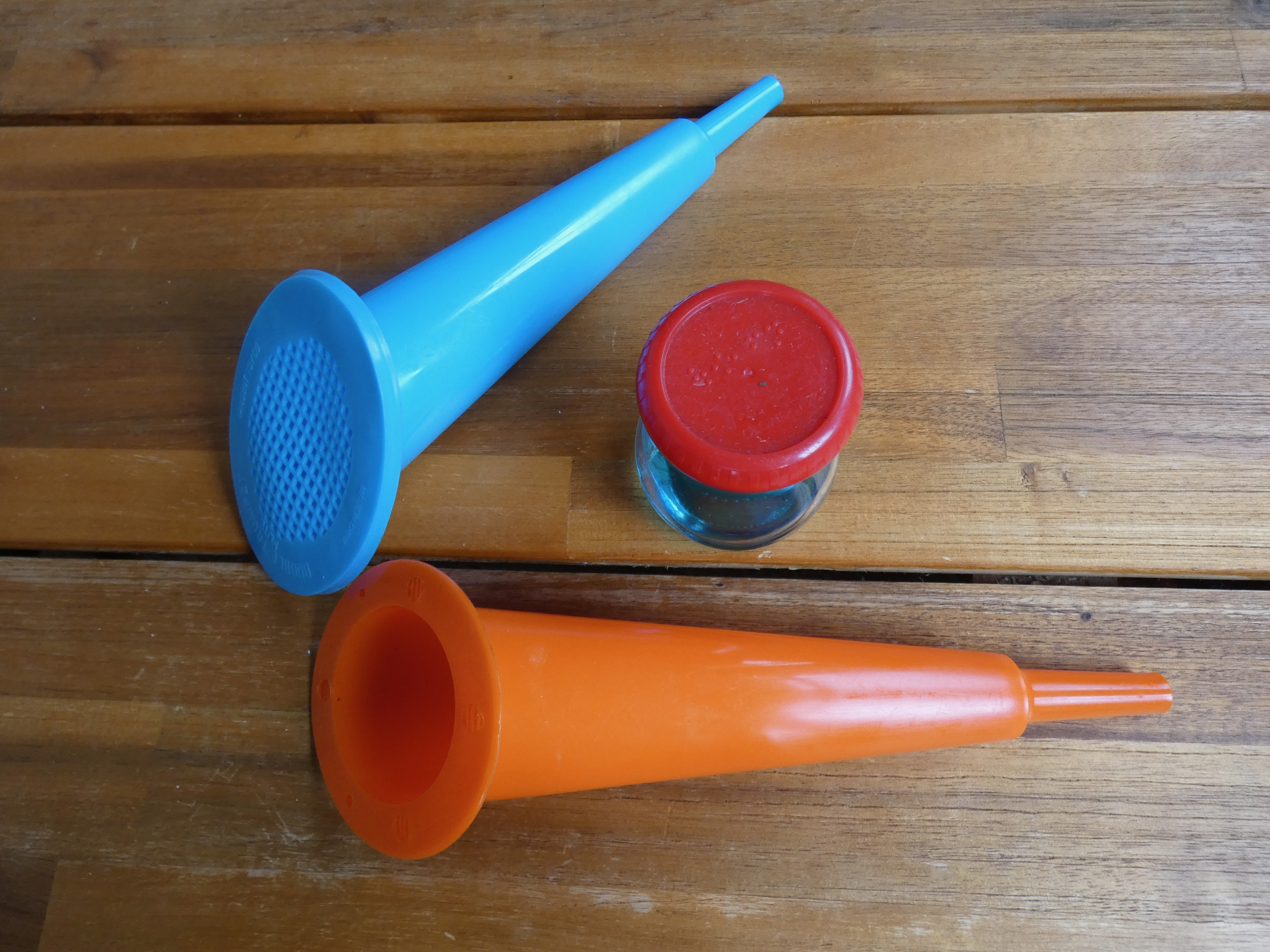
These are two Bubble Trumpets manufactured by Tangent Toys for making soap bubbles.

It was after graduation, while living in Berkeley that Louis designed and patented a toy called the Bubble Trumpet in 1978 that was inspired from his college art class days. The Bubble Trumpet was a cone-shaped piece of plastic with a lip to collect the soap solution. He spent the following two years working on sailboats, until December 1980, when he decided to manufacture 1000 trumpets using the blueprints. Using the toy he performed and sold it on Telegraph Avenue near the university. Unable to find a toy company to distribute his toy, he decided to distribute it himself and eventually found success after selling 15,000 bubble trumpets to The Nature Company. He built a successful company with 147 products being manufactured and distributed internationally called Tangent Toys. The warehouse in Sausalito for this business was featured in How Buildings Learn TV series and Louis would often kayak to work. The toy company had a factory in China and a bubble-making business in Germany.

In 1983, after watching Tom Noddy perform at the Exploratorium he turned his attention to bubble tricks. After a chance run-in with the iconic activist and entertainer Wavy Gravy at a nightclub in Mill Valley, the activist invited Pearl to Camp Winnarainbow, his theater and circus arts camp, for a session with adults before the kids arrived. Here, Pearl became acquainted with how to perform onstage.

After his stint at the camp, he began doing children's birthday parties in 1983, and then schools in 1987 often incorporating age-appropriate science lessons). He started touring California with his show and then began touring internationally in 2007.

He has performed for The Sultan of Brunei, Don Johnson, and the late actor Robin Williams. While his show is typically aimed at a younger audience he has also performed an adult-only show called "Bubble and Squeak" with his wife, Jetty Swart. In the United Kingdom, he tours annually, including performances at the Edinburgh Fringe Festival and the udderBELLY festival. In the United States, he regularly performs the Clinton Street Theater.

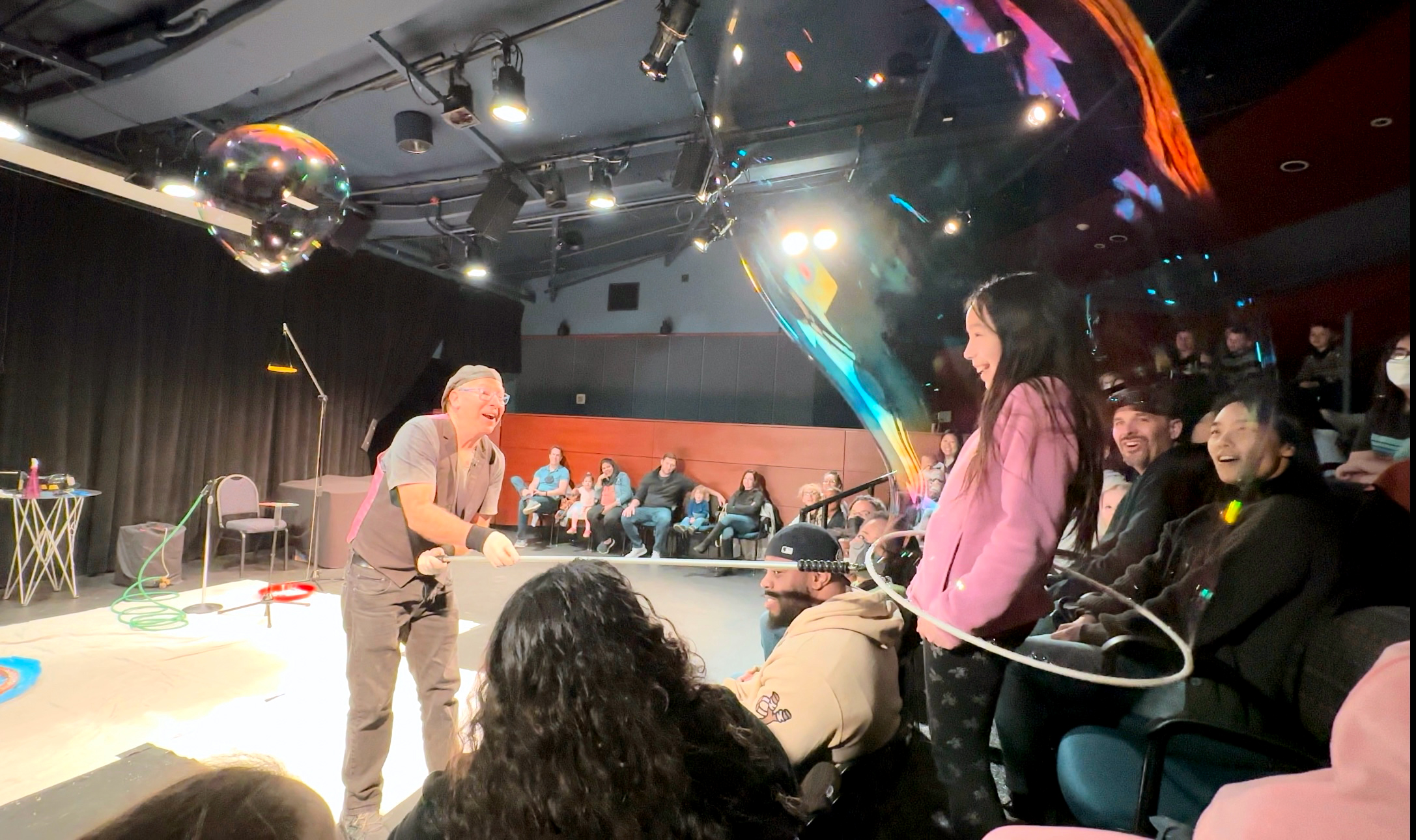
The Amazing Bubble Man encapsulates a child inside of a bubble.

His show at the Edinburgh Fringe, initially performed to adults in 2007, has become a mainstay and it was here on 23 August 2012 he was interviewed and appeared on the long-running children's British television show Blue Peter, obtaining a Blue Peter badge.

In addition to Blue Peter, his work has featured on television segments for KGW (2023), ITV Meridian (2024), BBC News (August 2023) and Philippine morning show Umagang Kay Ganda (2015).

In 1991, he published his first book Sudman's Bubble-ology Guide, a 30-page pamphlet that shows beginners how to create bubbles such as a "Hullaballoo Contortion," and a "Dodecahedron" bubble. It was co-authored by Larry Shaw and part of the interactive bubble kit for kids: "The Ultimate Bubble Kit" manufactured by The Nature Company. Louis sold Tangent Toys in 2002 to Washington-based Toysmith.

== See also ==
- Fan Yang (artist)
- Tom Noddy
