= Bainbridge Island Film Festival =

Annual film festival on Bainbridge Island, WA

Bainbridge Island Film Festival (BIFF)
- Location: Bainbridge Island, Washington, U.S.
- Founded: 1998 (as Celluloid Bainbridge Film Festival)
- Language: English
- Website: bifilmfest.org

Bainbridge Island Film Festival (BIFF) is an annual four-day film festival held on Bainbridge Island, Washington, United States during the second week of November. Venues include the Lynwood Theatre, Bainbridge Cinemas, and the Bainbridge Island Museum of Art. It is one of the largest festivals in Washington, featuring a variety of independent American and international films, as well as a significant selection of documentaries, with a focus on films produced in the Pacific Northwest.

== History ==
The festival—originally called the Celluloid Bainbridge Film Festival—was founded in 1998, launched by Kathleen Thorne (Program Manager for the Bainbridge Island Arts & Humanities Council) and the nonprofit Arts & Humanities Bainbridge, and hosted out of the Lynwood Theatre. Originally, the festival was a part of the Bainbridge Island Arts Walk, however it soon developed into a standalone two-day event. The scope of the festival was films made by Bainbridge Island filmmakers or filmed on the island. In 2016, organizers decided to expand programming selection to include films made by filmmakers from all of Washington State, Oregon, Idaho, Alaska, and British Columbia.

After running annually as a two-day festival for nearly two decades, the Celluloid Bainbridge Film Festival concluded in 2018. In 2023 filmmaker and Cornish College of the Arts professor Charles Poekel, with the support of Arts & Humanities Bainbridge, revived the festival, rebranding it as the Bainbridge Island Film Festival and expanding its venues and length.
