= Antibubble =

Droplet of liquid surrounded by a thin film of gas

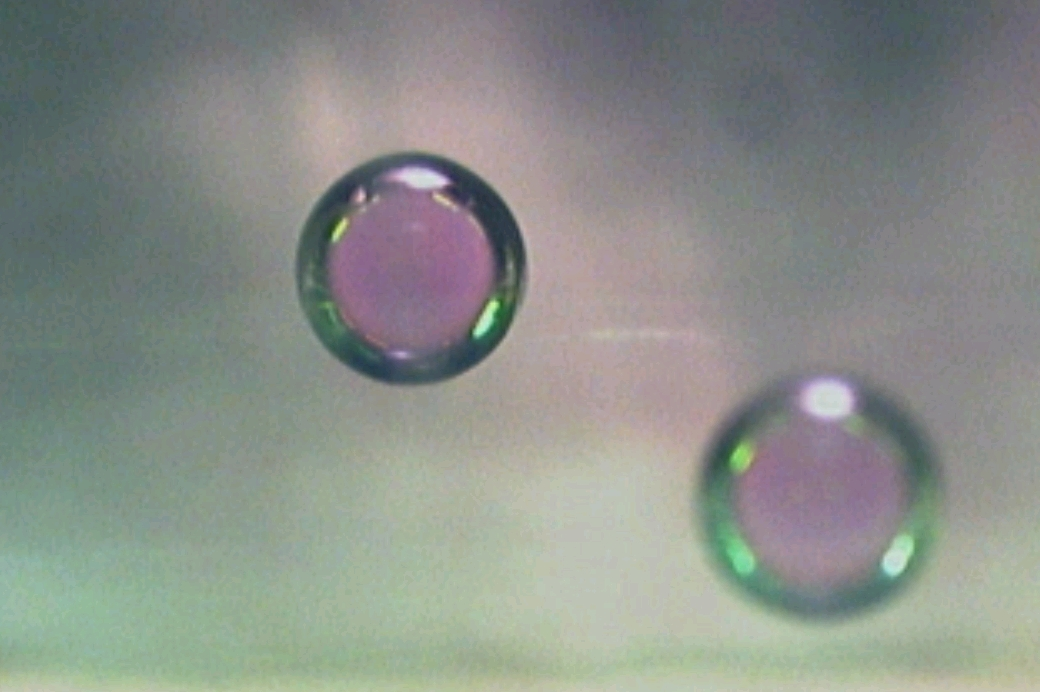
Submerged antibubbles of air surrounded by soapy water

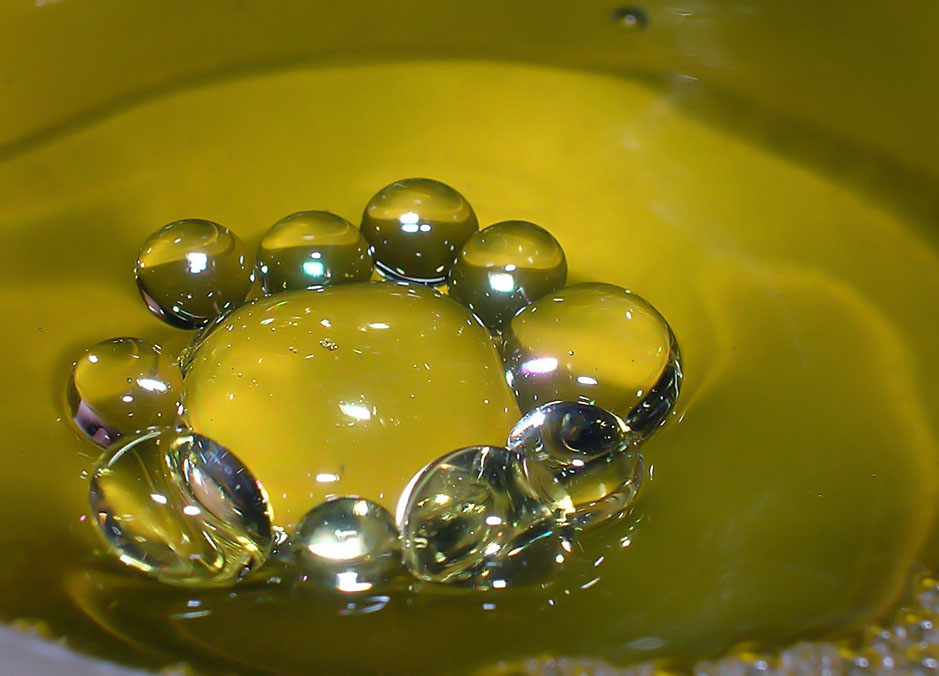
Cluster of antibubbles on the surface of soapy water

An antibubble is a droplet of liquid surrounded by a thin film of gas, as opposed to a gas bubble, which is a sphere of gas surrounded by a liquid. Antibubbles are formed when liquid drops or flows turbulently into the same or another liquid. They can either skim across the surface of a liquid such as water, in which case they are also called water globules, or they can be completely submerged into the liquid to which they are directed.

== Background ==
Antibubbles are a common but widely unrecognized phenomenon, in part because of their resemblance to air bubbles, and in part because of their typically transient, or short-lived, nature. With certain (soapy) solutions, they can be made to last much longer.

Antibubbles can be created by allowing a tap to drip into a container of water to which a drop or two of soap has been added. They have also been produced aided by an ultrasound contrast agent. Being inherently unstable, they are difficult to form. The soap reduces the water's surface tension and allows the skin of air surrounding the droplet to remain in place for more than just a fraction of a second. As antibubbles can be easily created at home, they have attracted attention from popular science magazines.

Just as soap bubbles, with air inside and air outside, have negative buoyancy and tend to sink towards the ground, so antibubbles, with water inside and air outside have positive buoyancy and tend to rise towards the water surface. But again, just as soap bubbles can be filled with a lighter gas to give them positive buoyancy, so antibubbles can be filled with a heavier liquid to give them negative buoyancy. Using a drinking straw to drop droplets of sugar solution onto soapy water will produce antibubbles that sink.

Antibubbles usually pop when they touch the bottom or the side of the vessel containing the liquid. This can be prevented by tipping a few teaspoons of sugar into the soapy water and giving it some time to dissolve (but without stirring it). This will produce a denser layer of sugary water at the bottom of the container. Antibubbles made from sugar solution will then sink through the water and rest on top of the denser layer at the bottom. Antibubbles made this way can last for several minutes.

The layers of an antibubble are water, which it is submerged in, air, and the water trapped in the air.

== Differences between air bubbles and antibubbles ==
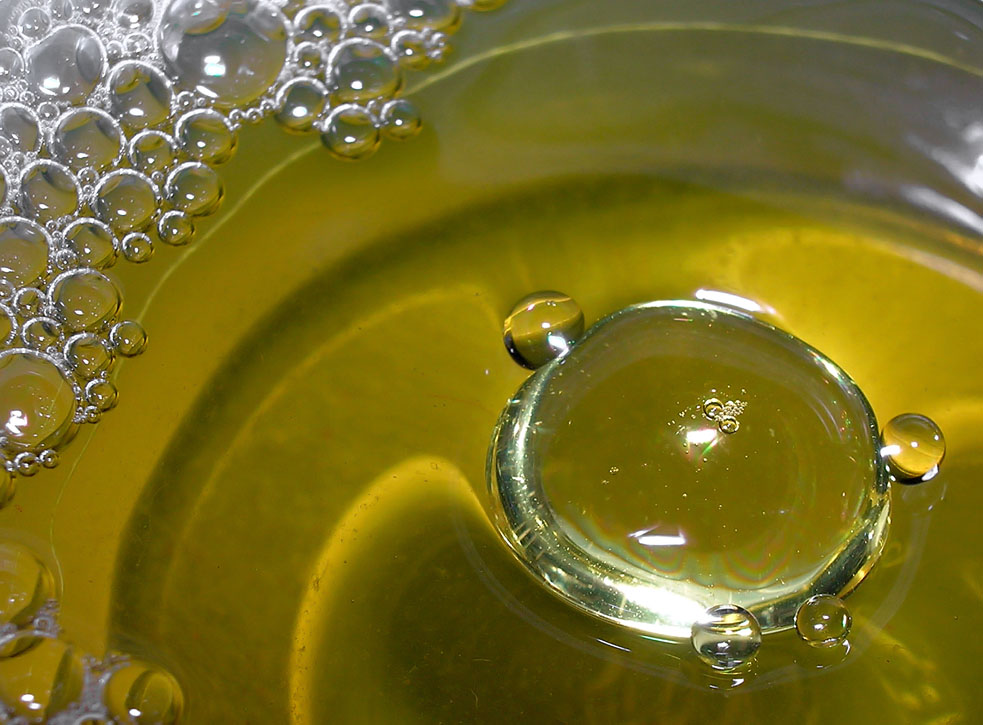
Comparison of three different types of bubbles: normal bubbles on the surface (top left), antibubbles on the surface (right), and submerged air bubbles within the largest of those antibubbles

The behavior of antibubbles differs from that of air bubbles in three primary ways, and provides a ready means of identification:

- Antibubbles are held in place by surface tension, and move rapidly across the surface of the water. They can also be seen to ricochet off other objects in the water (such as air bubbles) and off the sides of a container in a manner similar to that of billiard balls.
- Under ordinary circumstances, antibubbles are short-lived. An air bubble with a soap skin may last several minutes. Antibubbles often have lifetimes of a few seconds or less; however, if the electrical potential between the inner and outer fluid is equalized, antibubbles can last as long as, or longer than, air bubbles. Antibubbles with a lifetime of at least tens of hours can be produced by adsorbing colloidal particles at the air-water interfaces of the antibubble.
- Antibubbles refract light in a different manner than air bubbles. Because they are water droplets, light entering them is refracted back toward its source in the same manner as rainbows are produced. Because of this refraction, antibubbles have a bright appearance.

== Potential uses for antibubbles ==
If antibubbles can be stabilized they can be used to form a long lasting froth — antifoam. Possible uses for antifoam are as a lubricant or using the thin passageways permeating antifoam as a filter for air or other gasses.

Antibubbles themselves could be used for chemical processes such as removing pollutants from a smokestack. Replacing the air in antibubble shells with another liquid could be used for a drug delivery system by creating a shell of liquid-polymer around a drug. Hardening the polymer with ultraviolet light would create a drug filled capsule.

Microscopic antibubbles have demonstrated their feasibility in harmonic imaging. It has been proposed to incorporate therapeutics into antibubble cores. Such drug-loaded antibubbles might be used in ultrasound-guided drug delivery, where acoustic waves create sufficient pulsations of the antibubble surface to release its drug-containing core.

== Lifetime ==
The lifetime of an antibubble on top of a water surface might be prolonged by making the water underneath it vibrate. Such antibubbles have been referred to as "walking bubbles" and have been proposed to be used as a model of quantum mechanical behavior. Another way to increase the lifetime of antibubbles is by applying so-called Pickering stabilization.
