= Tim Kehoe =

Toy inventor and author from Minnesota

- Born: May 11, 1970; Saint Paul, Minnesota
- Died: February 27, 2014 (aged 43)
- Occupations: Novelist, Inventor
- Spouse: Sherri Kehoe
- Writing career
- Genre: Middle-Grade Fiction

Tim Kehoe (May 11, 1970 – February 27, 2014) was an author and toy inventor from St. Paul, Minnesota. He invented numerous toys, and was known primarily for inventing non-staining colored bubbles, Zubbles. Zubbles took more than 14 years to develop and incorporated a great deal of research in various fields, including chemistry and the science of dyeing. Kehoe died unexpectedly at the age of 43 in 2014.

== Author ==
Kehoe was the author of the Vincent Shadow series published by Little, Brown and Company. Eleven-year-old Vincent Shadow dreamed of being a toy inventor. He had notebooks full of ideas: bubbles that carried sound, rockets that pop into kites, and a football that would rather bite than be caught. Unfortunately, the secret attic lab where Vincent built his prototypes had seen more disasters than triumphs. But a chance encounter with eccentric toy inventor Howard G. Whiz, and the discovery of long-lost inventions by one of the world's greatest scientists would change Vincent's life forever.

Kehoe also authored the forthcoming middle-grade thriller Furious Jones and the Assassin's Secret.

Furious Jones’s dad is a thriller writer. One week before the release of his latest book, his dad was murdered onstage with Furious in a front row seat to witness it. Furious inherits an estate alongside his father's unresolved conflicts. But after spending time with a secret copy of his dad’s soon-to-be-released book, Furious decides to stop running and start chasing.

=== Books ===
- The Unusual Mind of Vincent Shadow, 11/01/2009, Little, Brown, and Company
- Vincent Shadow: Toy Inventor, 8/03/2011, Little, Brown, and Company
- Vincent Shadow: The Top Secret Toys, 11/02/2011, Little, Brown, and Company
- Furious Jones and the Assassin's Secret, Coming spring 2014, Simon & Schuster

== Awards ==
- 2005 Popular Science Grand Prize for Innovation
- 2006 One of America’s 100 Best by Reader's Digest
- 2006 'Forty Under 40' winner by the Business Journal
- 2008 'Pick of the Lists' choices at the Midwest Booksellers Association Fall Trade Show
- 2011 North Carolina Children's Book Award Nominee
