= Soap bubble =

Thin film of soapy water enclosing air

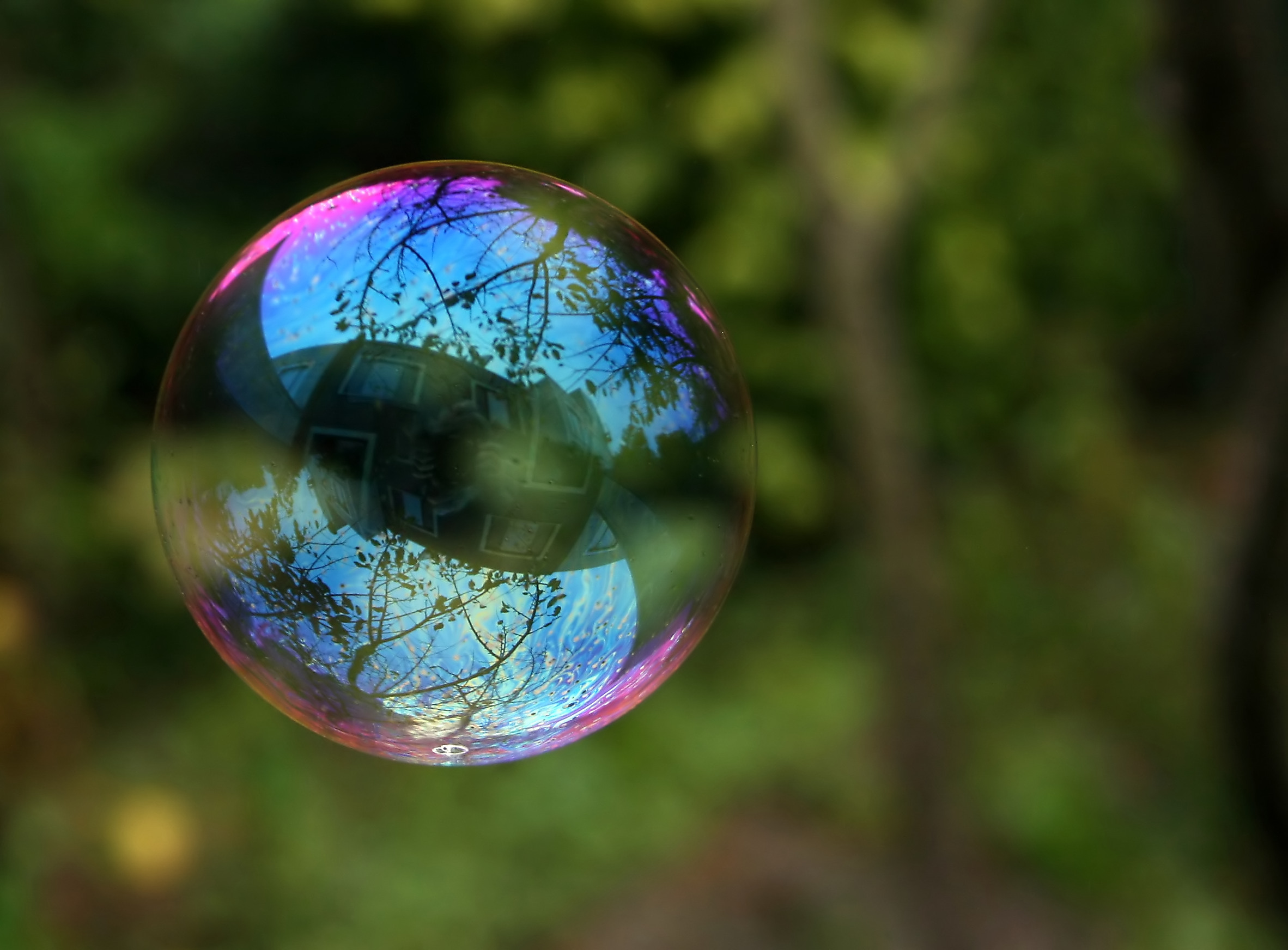
A soap bubble

A soap bubble (commonly referred to as simply a bubble) is an extremely thin film of soap or detergent and water enclosing air that forms a hollow sphere with an iridescent surface. Soap bubbles usually last for only a few seconds before bursting, either on their own or on contact with another object. They are often used for children's enjoyment, but they are also used in artistic performances. Assembling many bubbles results in foam.

When light shines onto a bubble it appears to change colour. Unlike those seen in a rainbow, which arise from differential refraction, the colours seen in a soap bubble arise from light wave interference, reflecting off the front and back surfaces of the thin soap film. Depending on the thickness of the film, different colours interfere constructively and destructively.

== Mathematics ==
Close-up of soap film, which makes up a soap bubble

Soap bubbles are physical examples of the complex mathematical problem of minimal surface. They will assume the shape of least surface area possible containing a given volume. A true minimal surface is more properly illustrated by a soap film, which has equal pressure on both sides, becoming a surface with zero mean curvature. A soap bubble is a closed soap film: due to the difference in outside and inside pressure, it is a surface of constant mean curvature.

While it has been known since 1884 that a spherical soap bubble is the least-area way of enclosing a given volume of air (a theorem of H. A. Schwarz), it was not until 2000 that it was proven that two merged soap bubbles provide the optimum way of enclosing two given volumes of air of different size with the least surface area. This has been dubbed the double bubble conjecture.

Because of these qualities, soap bubble films have been used in practical problem solving applications. Structural engineer Frei Otto used soap bubble films to determine the geometry of a sheet of least surface area that spreads between several points, and translated this geometry into revolutionary tensile roof structures. A famous example is his West German Pavilion at Expo 67 in Montreal.

=== Soap bubbles as unconventional computing ===
The structures that soap films make can not just be enclosed as spheres, but virtually any shape, for example in wire frames. Therefore, many different minimal surfaces can be designed. It is actually sometimes easier to physically make them than to compute them by mathematical modelling. This is why the soap films can be considered as analog computers which can outperform conventional computers, depending on the complexity of the system.

== Physics ==
=== Merging ===
Slow motion video of soap bubbles being formed by a bubble wand

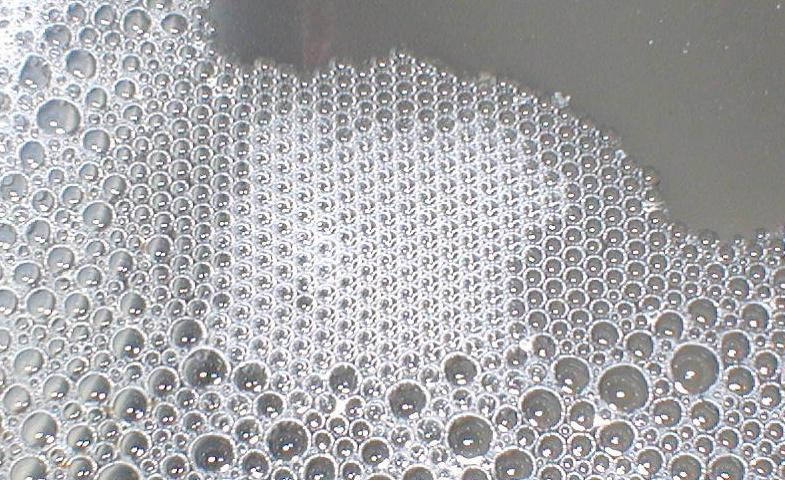
Many bubbles make foam

When two bubbles merge, they adopt a shape which makes the sum of their surface areas as small as possible, compatible with the volume of air each bubble encloses. If the bubbles are of equal size, their common wall is flat. If they are not the same size, their common wall bulges into the larger bubble, since the smaller one has a higher internal pressure than the larger one, as predicted by the Young–Laplace equation.

At a point where three or more bubbles meet, they sort themselves out so that only three bubble walls meet along a line. Since the surface tension is the same in each of the three surfaces, the three angles between them must be equal to 120°. Only four bubble walls can meet at a point, with the lines where triplets of bubble walls meet separated by cos^{−1}(−1/3) ≈ 109.47°. All these rules, known as Plateau's laws, determine how a foam is built from bubbles.

=== Stability ===
The longevity of a soap bubble is limited by the ease of rupture of the very thin layer of water which constitutes its surface, namely a micrometer-thick soap film. It is thus sensitive to :

- Drainage within the soap film: water falls down due to gravity. This can be slowed by increasing the water viscosity, for instance by adding glycerol. Still, there is an ultimate height limit, which is the capillary length, very high for soap bubbles: around 13 feet (4 meters). In principle, there is no limit in the length it can reach.
- Evaporation: This can be slowed by blowing bubbles in a wet atmosphere, or by adding some sugar to the water.
- Dirt and fat: When the bubble touches an object, it usually ruptures the soap film. This can be prevented by wetting these surfaces with water (preferably containing some soap).

After experiments, researchers found that a solution containing:

- 85.9% water
- 10% glycerol
- 4% dishwashing liquid
- 0.1% guar gum

gave the longest lasting results as it minimised the Marangoni Effect.

=== Wetting ===
When a soap bubble is in contact with a solid or a liquid surface wetting is observed. On a solid surface, the contact angle of the bubble depends on the surface energy of the solid. A soap bubble has a larger contact angle on a solid surface displaying ultrahydrophobicity than on a hydrophilic surface – see Wetting. On a liquid surface, the contact angle of the soap bubble depends on its size - smaller bubbles have lower contact angles.

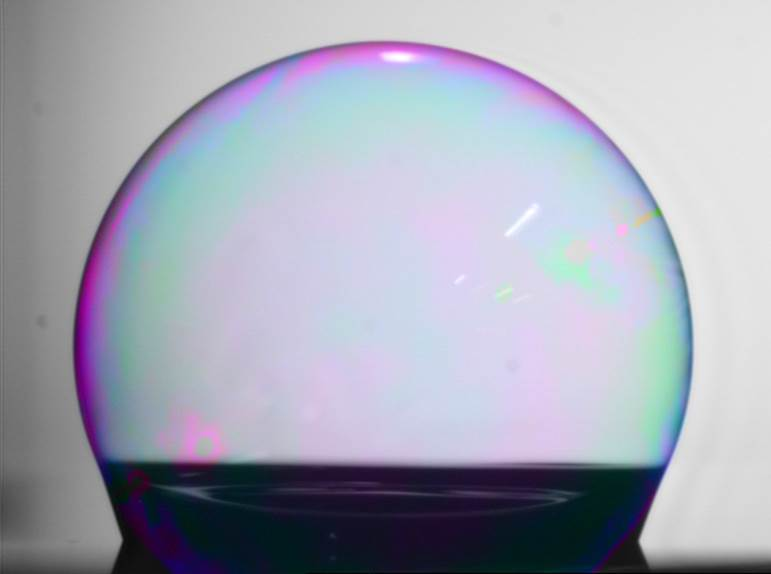
A soap bubble wetting an ultrahydrophobic surface

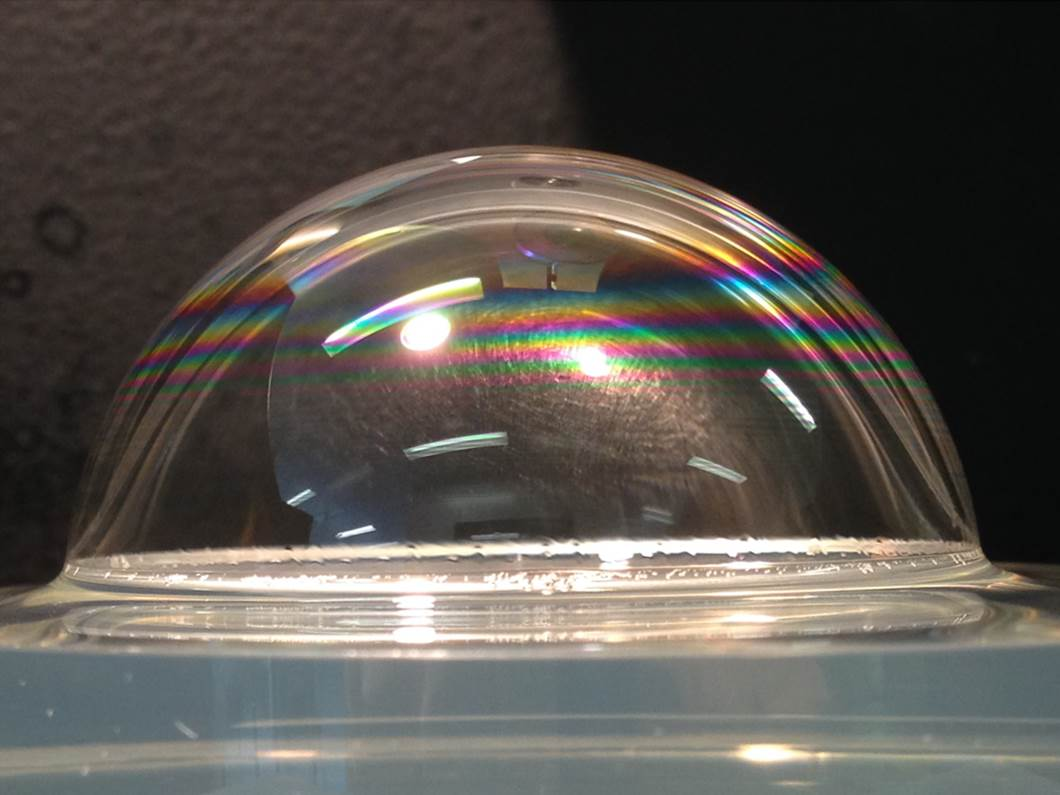
A soap bubble wetting a liquid surface

=== Floatation ===
The liquid shell of a soap bubble is heavier than air. However the gas inside a bubble typically contains more water vapor than the surrounding air. Water vapor is less dense than dry air, which can give the bubble positive buoyancy. This can be increased by using warm liquid, since this increases the temperature of the gas inside the bubble and therefore decreases its density.

== Recreation ==
=== Use in play ===
Soap bubbles have been used as entertainment for at least 400 years, as evidenced by 17th-century Flemish paintings showing children blowing bubbles with clay pipes. The London-based firm A. & F. Pears created a famous advertising campaign for its soaps in 1886 using a painting by John Everett Millais of a child playing with bubbles. The Chicago company Chemtoy began selling bubble solution in the 1940s, and bubble solution has been popular with children ever since. According to one industry estimate, retailers sell around 200 million bottles annually. Dishwashing liquid with water and additional ingredients such as glycerin and sugar is used as a popular alternative to a ready made bubble solution.

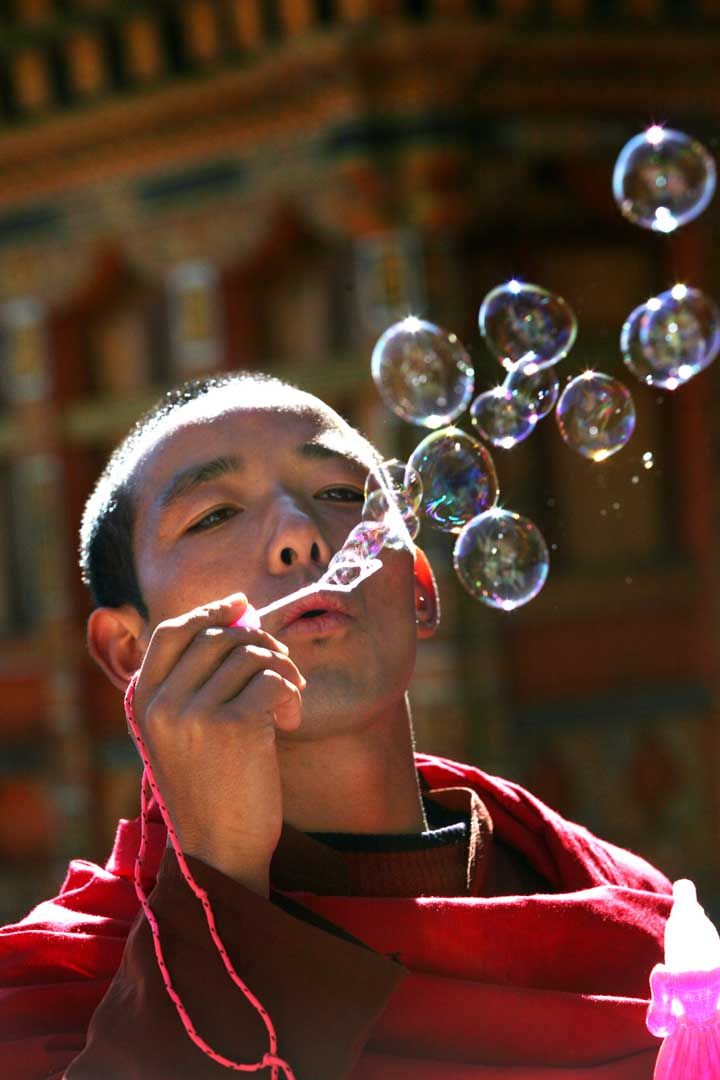
Blowing bubbles through a small wand

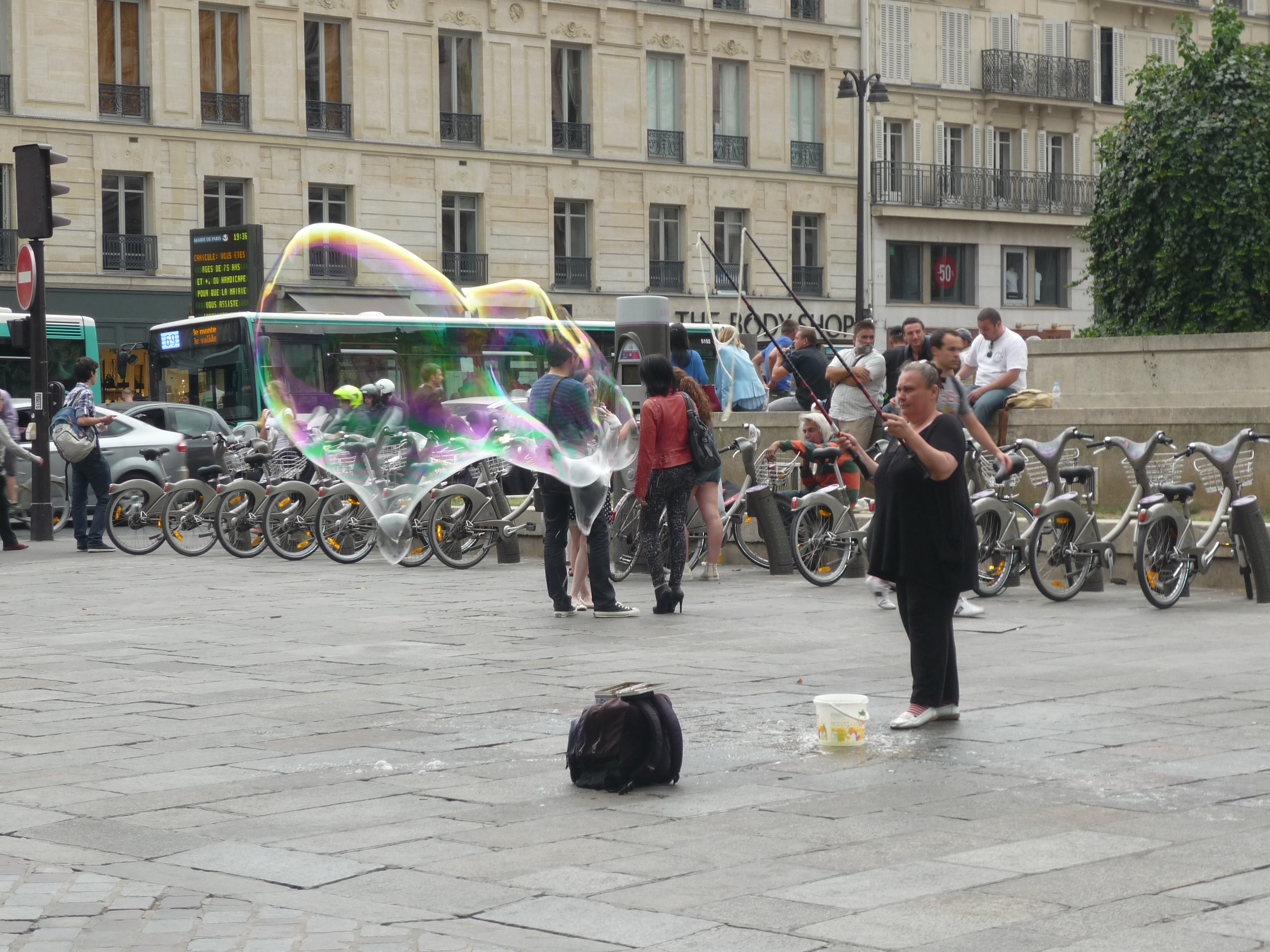
A street entertainer creats a giant bubble

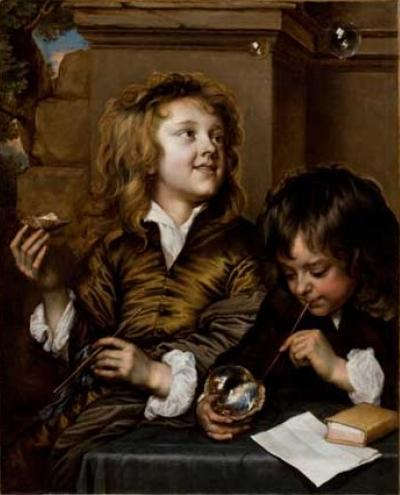
Adriaen Hanneman, Two Boys Blowing Bubbles (c. 1630)

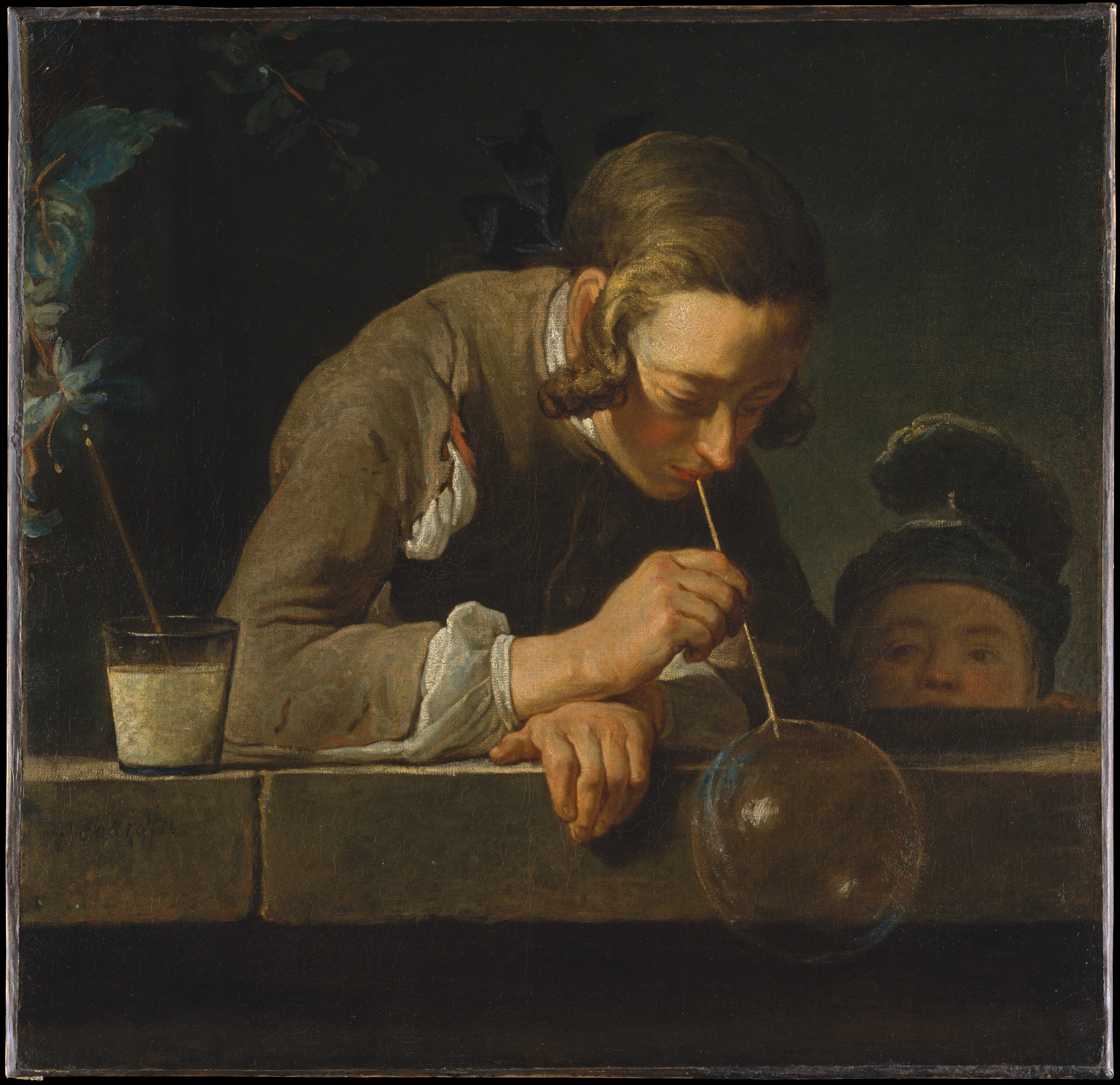
Jean-Baptiste-Siméon Chardin, Soap Bubbles (c. 1734)

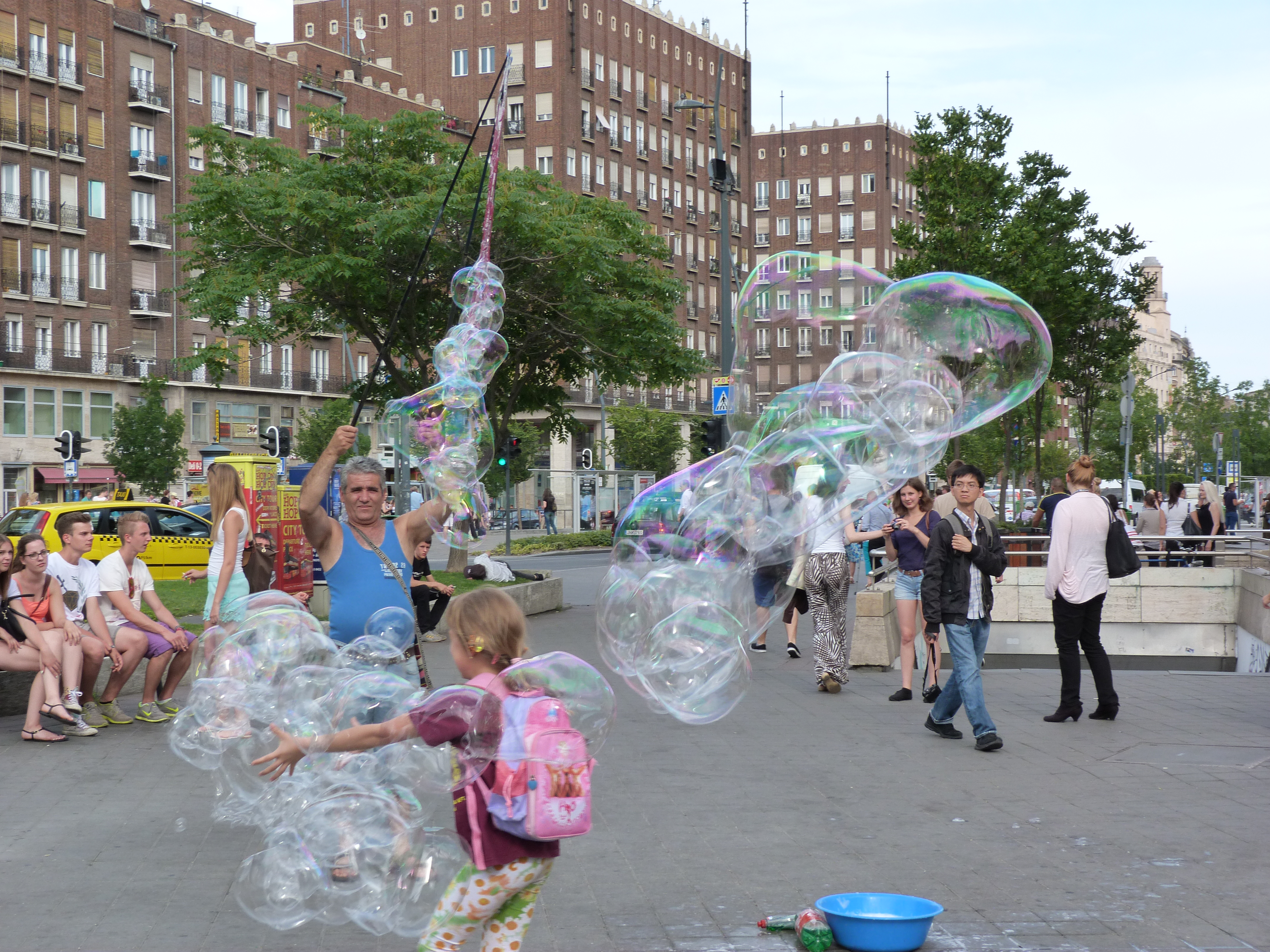
A young girl playing with soap bubbles

=== Colored bubbles ===
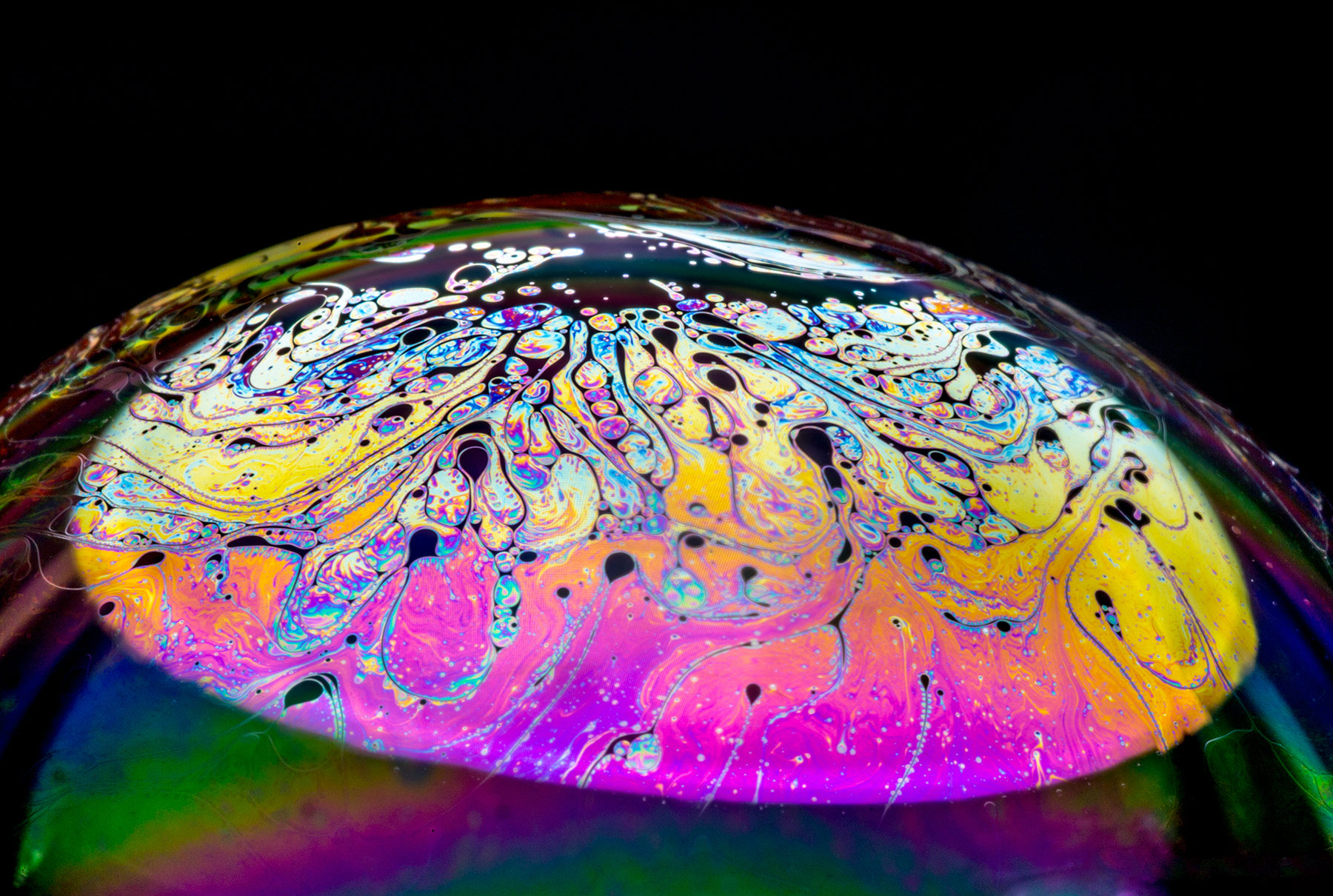
Close-up of a soap bubble, with soap film visible

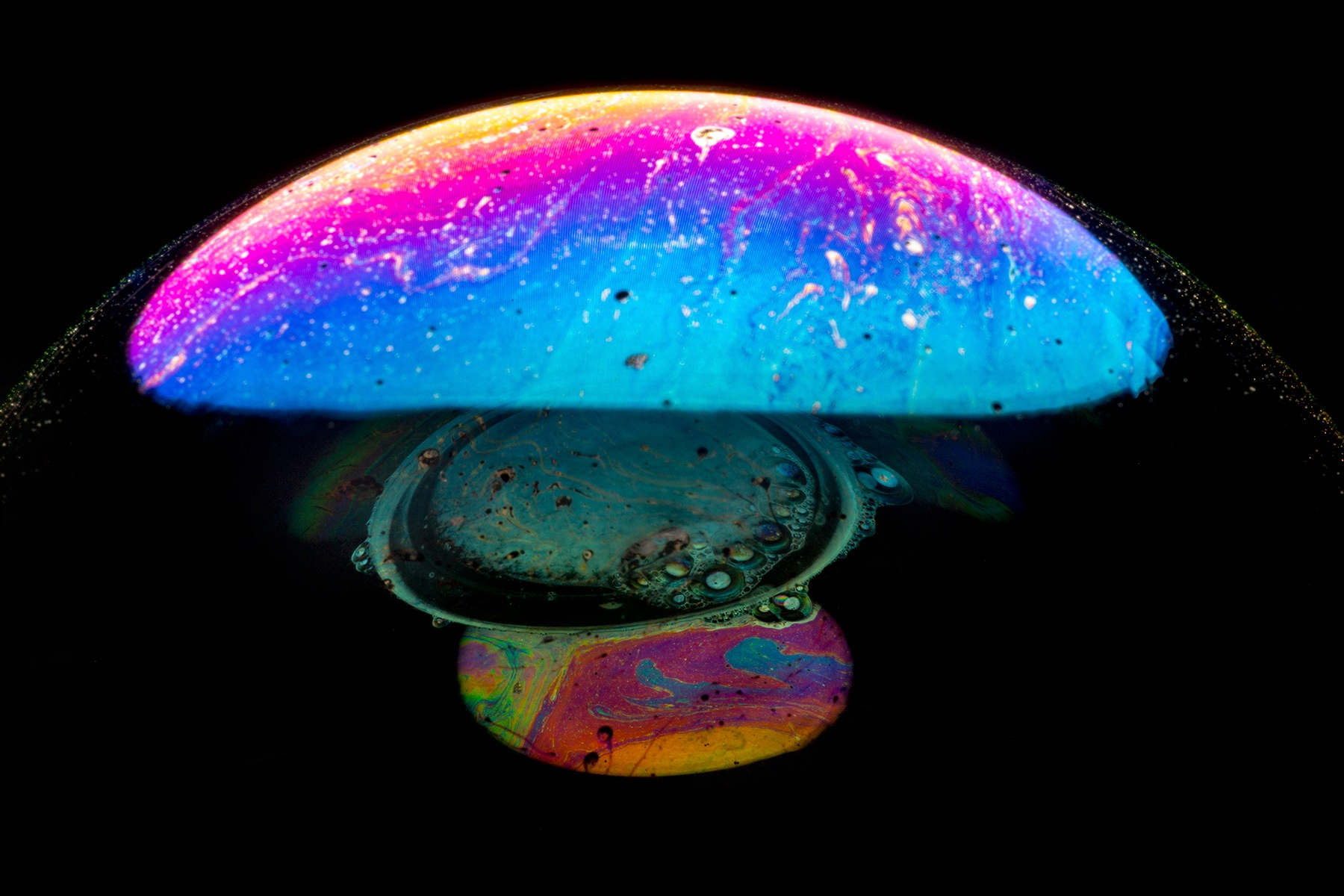
A single soap bubble displaying three layers

A bubble is made of transparent water enclosing transparent air. However, the soap film is as thin as the visible light wavelength, resulting in optical interference. This creates iridescence which, together with the bubble's spherical shape and fragility, contributes to its magical effect on children and adults alike. Each colour is the result of varying thicknesses of soap bubble film. Tom Noddy (who featured in the second episode of Marcus du Sautoy's The Code) gave the analogy of looking at a contour map of the bubbles' surface. However, it has become a challenge to produce artificially coloured bubbles.

Byron, Melody & Enoch Swetland invented a patented non-toxic bubble (Tekno Bubbles) that glow under UV lighting. These bubbles look like ordinary high quality "clear" bubbles under normal lighting, but glow when exposed to true UV light. The brighter the UV lighting, the brighter they glow. The family sold them worldwide, but has since sold their company.

Adding coloured dye to bubble mixtures fails to produce coloured bubbles, because the dye attaches to the water molecules as opposed to the surfactant. Therefore, a colourless bubble forms with the dye falling to a point at the base. Dye chemist Dr. Ram Sabnis has developed a lactone dye that sticks to the surfactants, enabling brightly coloured bubbles to be formed. Crystal violet lactone is an example. Another man named Tim Kehoe invented a coloured bubble which loses its colour when exposed to pressure or oxygen, which he is now marketing online as Zubbles, which are non-toxic and non-staining. In 2010, Japanese astronaut Naoko Yamazaki demonstrated that it is possible to create coloured bubbles in microgravity. The reason is that the water molecules are spread evenly around the bubble in the low-gravity environment.

=== Freezing ===
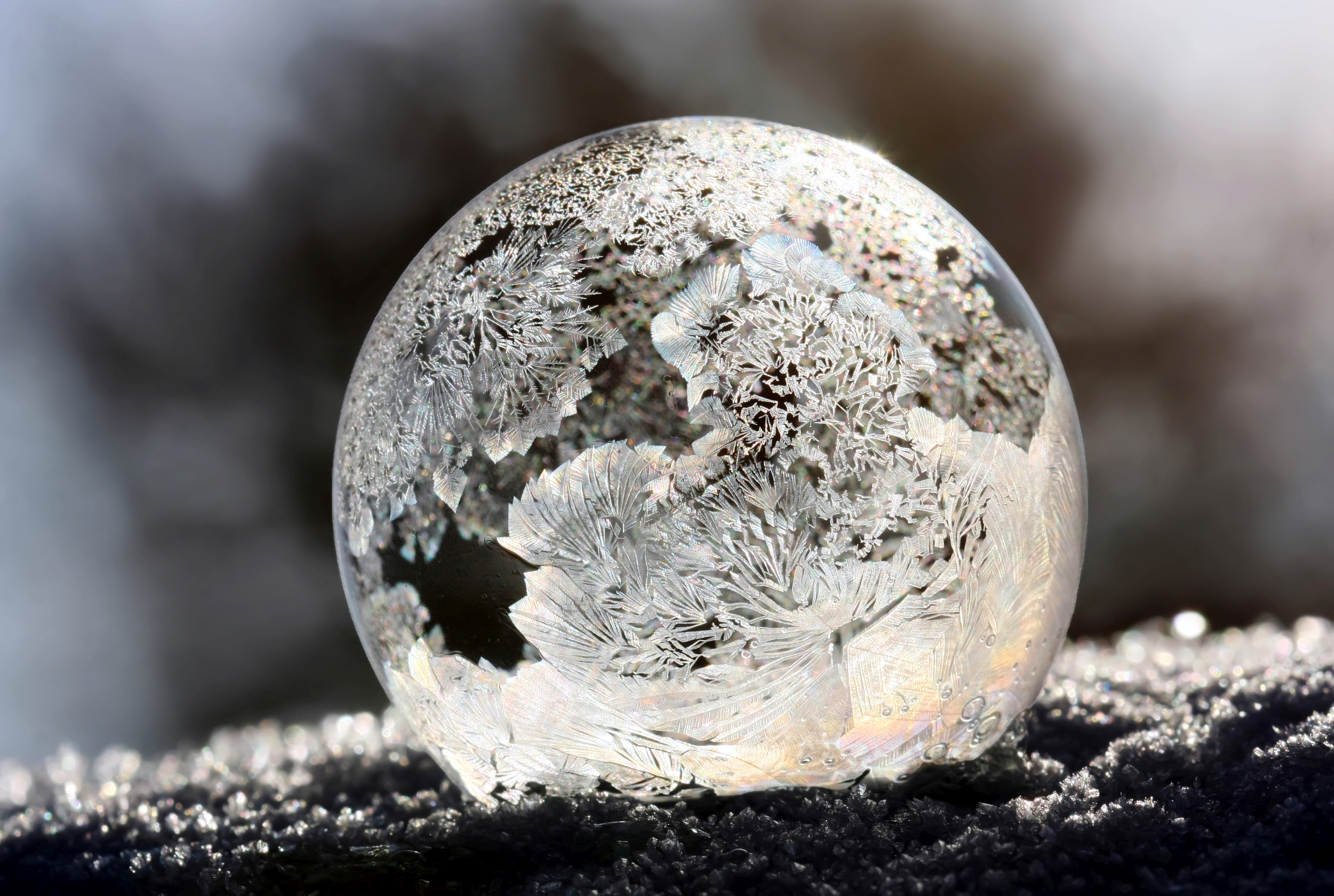
A frozen soap bubble

If soap bubbles are blown into air that is below a temperature of −15 °C (5 °F), they will freeze when they touch a surface. The air inside will gradually diffuse out, causing the bubble to crumble under its own weight. At temperatures below about −25 °C (−13 °F), bubbles will freeze in the air and may shatter when hitting the ground. When a bubble is blown with warm air, the bubble will freeze to an almost perfect sphere at first, but when the warm air cools, and a reduction in volume occurs, there will be a partial collapse of the bubble. A bubble, created successfully at this low temperature, will always be rather small; it will freeze quickly and will shatter if increased further. Freezing of small soap bubbles happens within 2 seconds after setting on snow (at air temperature around –10...–14 °C).

== Art ==
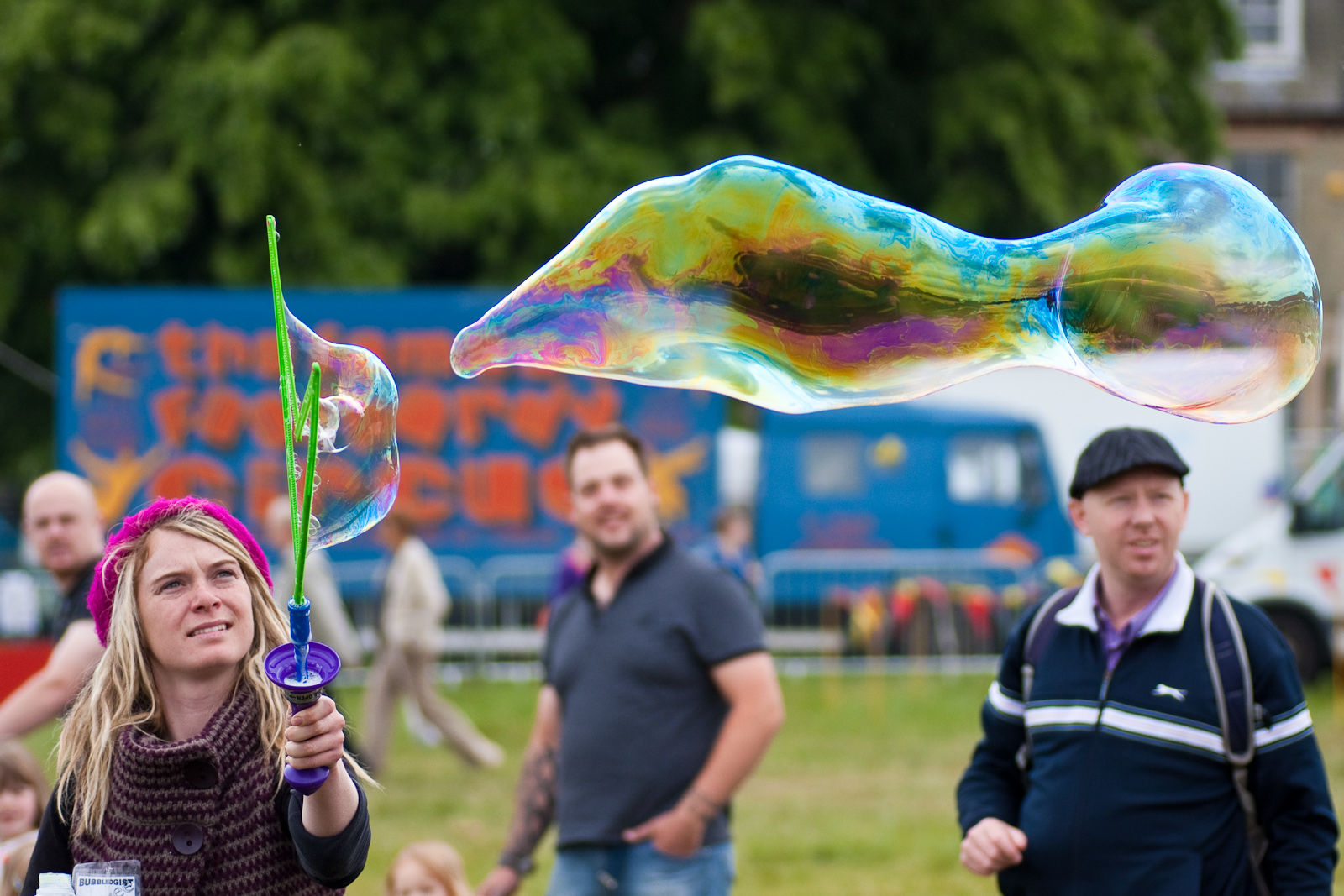
A 'bubbleologist' at the 2009 Strawberry Fair in Cambridge, UK

Soap bubble performances combine entertainment with artistic achievement. Some performers use common commercially available bubble liquids while others compose their own solutions. Some artists create giant bubbles or tubes, often enveloping objects or even humans. Others manage to create bubbles forming cubes, tetrahedra and other shapes and forms. Bubbles are sometimes handled with bare hands.

To add to the visual experience, they are sometimes filled with smoke, vapour or helium and combined with laser lights or fire. Soap bubbles can be filled with a flammable gas such as natural gas and then ignited. Some professional bubble artists are Tom Noddy, Fan Yang and The Amazing Bubble Man.

== Education ==
Bubbles can be effectively used to teach and explore a wide variety of concepts to even young children. Bubbles are useful in teaching concepts starting from 2 years old and into college years. A Swiss university professor, Dr. Natalie Hartzell, has theorized that the usage of artificial bubbles for entertainment purposes of young children has shown a positive effect in the region of the child's brain that controls motor skills and is responsible for coordination with children exposed to bubbles at a young age showing measurably better motion skills than those who were not.

== See also ==
- Antibubble
- Bubble pipe
- Foam
- Joseph Plateau
- Stretched grid method
- Weaire–Phelan structure

Scale	Generation	Structure	Stability	Dynamic	Experiments and characterization	Transport properties	Irisations	Maths	Applications	Fun
Surfactants		Micelles, HLB		Surface rheology, adsorption	Langmuir trough, ellipsometry, Xray, surface rheology					
Films	Frankel's law	Surface tension, DLVO, disjoining pressure	dewetting, bursting	Marangoni, surface rheology	Interferometry, Thin film balance		Interferences	double bubble theorem		Giant films
Bubbles		shape, Plateau's laws	foam drainage	T1 process		acoustics, electric	Interferences	double bubble theory		Giant bubbles, coloured bubbles, freezing
Foam		Liquid fraction, metastable state	Coalescence, avalanches, coarsening, foam drainage	rheology	light scattering acoustics, conductimetry, Surface Evolver, bubble model, Potts' model	acoustics, light scattering	light scattering	Packing and topology	Aquafoams	
