= Fan Yang (artist) =

Vietnamese-born Canadian soap bubble artist

- Born: 1962 (age 63–64); Haiphong, Vietnam
- Citizenship: Canada
- Occupation: Entertainer
- Known for: The Gazillion Bubble Show, 16-time Guinness World Record holder
- Spouse: Ana Yang
- Children: 2
- Website: http://www.gazillionbubbleshow.com

Fan Yang (born 1962) is a Canadian bubble artist. Among his productions is the Gazillion Bubble Show, an off-Broadway production that has run for nearly 20 years.

== Early life ==
Fan Yang was born in Vietnam in 1962; his father is Hungarian and his mother is a Haiphong native.

== Career ==
Yang has earned international notice as a result of his complex displays of bubble theater. He developed his own bubble solution formulas and equipment to create bubbles and has broken bubble-related world records on numerous occasions. Yang produces the Gazillion Bubble Show, a family-friendly "multimedia presentation" in which he "entertains with bubble sculpture, music, laser effects and video projections [and] incorporates ... lots of audience participation ... encasing volunteers in bubbles". The show has run off-Broadway in New York City for nearly 20 years and is set to close on September 7, 2026, after 6,802 performances. Due to heightened demand after the announced closing, the show was extended through January 17, 2027. He has staged it elsewhere, including Las Vegas, Nevada. His wife, Ana Yang, has performed the show in his absence.

== World records ==
Fan's first 11 world records related to bubbles:

- Berlin, Germany, 1992: The largest spherical soap bubble. (2.3 m circumference)
- Pacific Science Center Seattle, Washington, August 11, 1997: The world’s largest bubble wall. (47.4 m lengthwise)
- Hollywood, California, May 5, 1999: The most bubbles inside 9 concentric bubbles, inside each other.
- Paris, France, March 29, 2000: The most bubbles inside 11 concentric bubbles inside each other.
- Wavrin, France, April 1, 2000: Passage into a bubble hemisphere. His daughter slid into a bubble hemisphere going through the bubble film without bursting it.
- Helsinki, Finland, October 20, 2001: Record for the most concentric bubbles. (12 domes)
- Stockholm, Sweden, November 27, 2001: Record for the most bubbles attached on each other in mid-air (9).
- Santa Ana, California, April 7, 2004: World record for The Most People Inside a Soap Bubble (8 people)
- New York City, United States, March 18, 2005: Guinness World Record for the most people inside a soap bubble at Toys 'R' Us
- Santa Ana, California, April 12, 2006: Encapsulating 15 pairs of people in their own bubble cubicles for 5 seconds and linking them together to create a "Mega Bubble Cage"
- Madrid, Spain, May 25, 2006: Encapsulating 22 people inside a single soap bubble.
- Chicago, Illinois, United States, January 30, 2008: Encapsulating 100 people inside a single soap bubble on The Oprah Winfrey Show.

== Television performances ==
- Late Night with David Letterman; NBC
- The Ellen DeGeneres Show; NBC
- Jerry Lewis MDA Telethon; CBS
- The Statler Brothers Show; TNN
- Disney-MGM
- NHK-TV; Japan
- RAI-TV; Italy
- Canale 5; Italy
- ZDF-TV; Germany
- TF-1; France
- Nickelodeon-Universal Studios, Florida, U.S.
- Television Chile Guinness Prime Time
- FOX TV, CCTV Beijing, China
- Television Corporation of Singapore (TCS)
- TLC; U.S., (The Learning Channel)
- LWT (London Weekend Television); CCTV
- BBC; Canada
- Cirque du Soleil Soltrom
- SBS, South Korea
- Beirut, Lebanon (Biel)
- Ordinary/Extraordinary, Florida, 1996

== See also ==
- Tom Noddy
- The Amazing Bubble Man
