= Tom Noddy =

Bubble artist and American entertainer

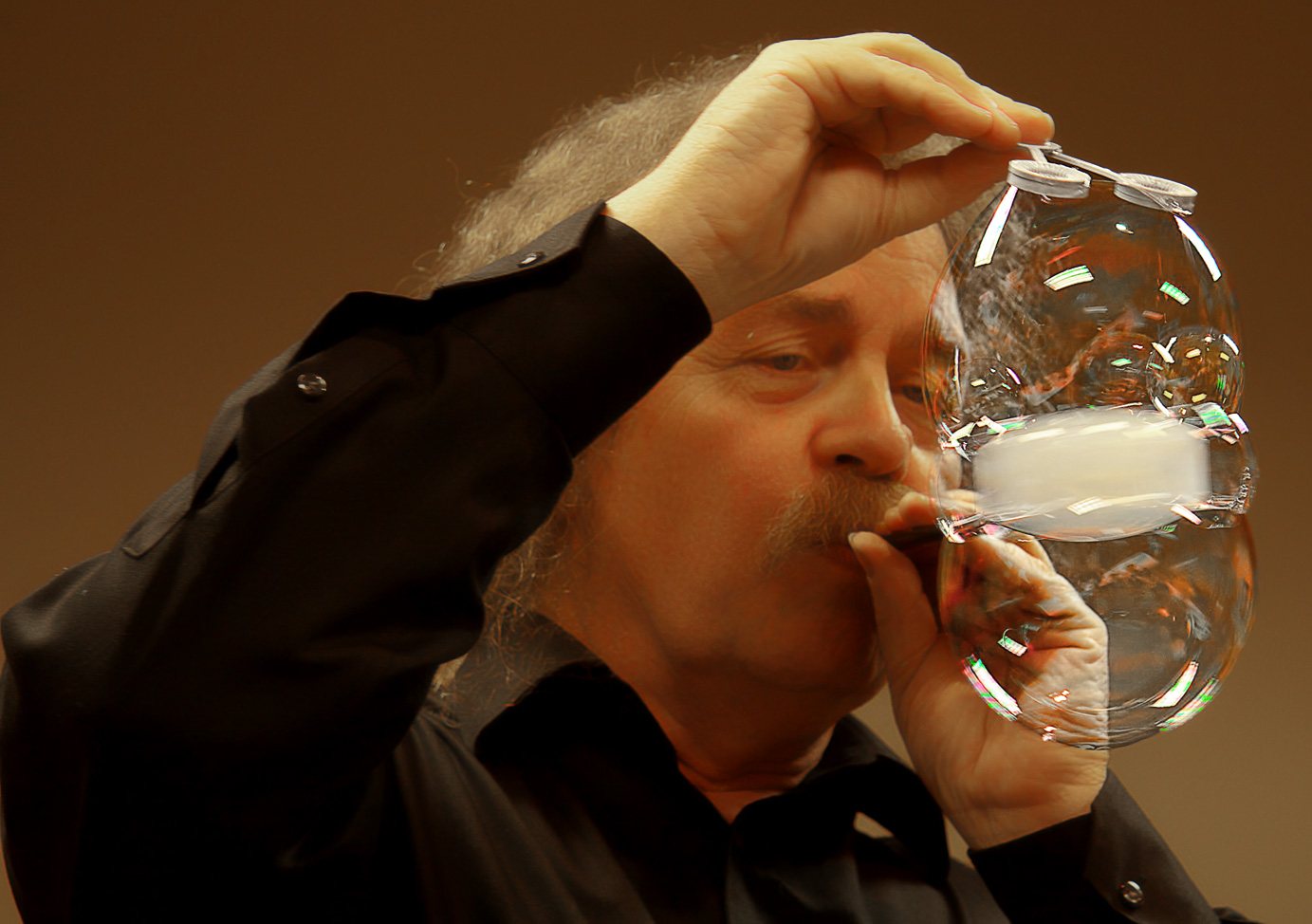
Tom Noddy in 2010

Tom Noddy is the stage name of Tom McAllister, an American entertainer whose television performances of "Bubble Magic" with soap bubbles in the early 1980s led to a book deal and "Bubble Festivals" at science centers across America. He is the originator of a large number of bubble magic tricks now performed by entertainers around the world.

In 1980, Noddy's performance was featured as a segment on an American television program On the Road with Charles Kuralt.

In 1983, Noddy performed on American television's That's Incredible! and Johnny Carson's Tonight Show. He subsequently performed on the UK's Paul Daniels Magic Show, France's Incroyable Mais Vrai, Germany's Die verflixte Sieben with Rudi Carrell, Ireland's Pat Kenny Chat Show, Australia's Mike Walsh Show, Netherlands' De Bananasplit Show, Japan's Chikyū Donburi, Norway's Scantertainment and several others.

Following the attention that this exposure brought to him, Noddy worked with San Francisco's Exploratorium to develop a Bubble Festival in 1983 that featured Noddy's performance and that of another bubble performer whom Noddy encountered in his travels. With octogenarian Eiffel G. Plasterer performing his Bubbles Concerto and Exploratorium exhibits highlighting the science of soap films and allowing the public to experiment with soap bubbles for themselves, the event attracted an estimated 15,000 people over a weekend in 1983.

These appearances came after more than a decade of developing his skill with soap bubbles and inventing the tricks featured in his performances. In 1988, Noddy's how-to book: Tom Noddy's Bubble Magic was published in the US by Running Press and helped to inspire several other performers to turn their attention to soap bubbles.

Some of Noddy's later television appearances included the Late Show with David Letterman (USA, February 27, 2007), and Germany's TV Total with Stefan Raab in 2009.

Tom Noddy continues to bring his performance and science education to science centers in the US, Europe and other parts of the world (Abu Dhabi in November 2011). In August 2011, he featured in the BBC television program The Code, presented by mathematician Marcus du Sautoy, where he demonstrated the ability of bubbles to form minimal surface structures. In 2018, Noddy was the subject of a documentary short by director Charles Poekel.

== Publications ==
- Noddy, Tom (1988). Tom Noddy's Bubble Magic. Running Press. ISBN 9780894716614. OCLC 19288293.

== See also ==
- The Amazing Bubble Man
- Fan Yang (artist)
