= Lynwood Theatre =

Coordinates: 47°36′16″N 122°32′51″W

- Interactive map of Lynwood Theatre
- Address: 4569 Lynwood Center Road NE; Bainbridge Island, Washington; United States of America
- Owner: Far Away Entertainment
- Capacity: 200
- Screen: 1
- Current use: Film

Website
- www.farawayentertainment.com/locations/historic-lynwood-theatre

The Lynwood Theatre is a historic movie theater located on Bainbridge Island in Kitsap County, Washington. It primarily screens independent and foreign films.

== History ==
The Lynwood Theatre opened on July 3, 1936, as the first theater on Bainbridge Island to screen sound films, including She Couldn't Take It and Times Square Playboy. Founded by Edna and Emmanuel Olson, the 200-seat single screen theater was intended to offer a modern alternative to the silent film cinemas on the island.

The Lynwood Theatre is one of the three longest continuously-operating businesses on Bainbridge Island. In the 1950s, the Olsons sold the theatre to nephew Glenn Nolta and his wife Lucille. Former Winslow mayor Sam Granato bought the Lynwood Theater from the Noltas in 1980. In 2000, the Lynwood Theatre transitioned into an art-house cinema focused on programming independent and foreign films. By 2008 the Lynwood Theatre was co-owned by Sam Granato and Jeff Brien and the building the cinema is a part of, the Lynwood Center, was renovated.

The Lynwood Theatre has been a host venue for the Celluloid Bainbridge Film Festival as well as the Bainbridge Island Film Festival.

Special events are sometimes held at the Lynwood Theatre, including comedy shows. Comedians Chris Kattan and Derek Sheen hosted a performance at the theater to support its continued operation.
