= K-noid =

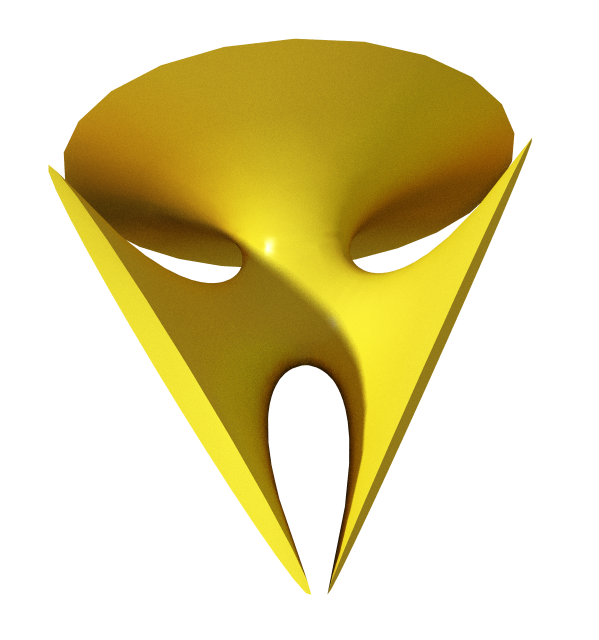
Trinoid

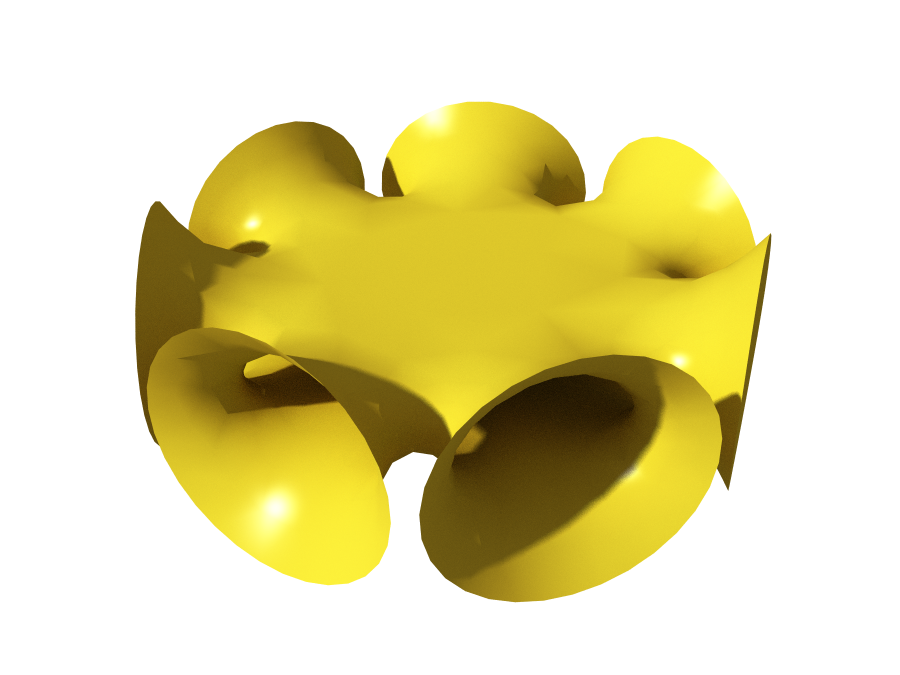
7-noid

In differential geometry, a k-noid is a minimal surface with k catenoid openings. In particular, the 3-noid is often called trinoid. The first k-noid minimal surfaces were described by Jorge and Meeks in 1983.

The term k-noid and trinoid is also sometimes used for constant mean curvature surfaces, especially branched versions of the unduloid ("triunduloids").

k-noids are topologically equivalent to k-punctured spheres (spheres with k points removed). k-noids with symmetric openings can be generated using the Weierstrass–Enneper parameterization $f(z) = 1/(z^k-1)^2, g(z) = z^{k-1}\,\!$. This produces the explicit formula

$$\begin{align}
X(z) = \frac{1}{2} \Re \Bigg\{ \Big(\frac{-1}{kz(z^k-1)} \Big)  \Big[ &(k-1)(z^k-1)_2F_1(1,-1/k;(k-1)/k;z^k)\\
& {}-(k-1)z^2(z^k-1)_2F_1(1,1/k;1+1/k;z^k) \\
&{}-kz^k +k+z^2-1  \Big] \Bigg\}
\end{align}$$

$$\begin{align}
Y(z) = \frac{1}{2} \Re  \Bigg\{ \Big(\frac{i}{kz(z^k-1)}\Big) \Big[ &(k-1)(z^k-1)_2F_1(1,-1/k;(k-1)/k;z^k) \\
&{}+(k-1)z^2(z^k-1)_2F_1(1,1/k;1+1/k;z^k)\\
& {}-kz^k+k-z^2-1 )  \Big] \Bigg\}
\end{align}$$

$$Z(z) =\Re \left \{ \frac{1}{k-kz^k} \right\}$$

where $_2F_1(a,b;c;z)$ is the Gaussian hypergeometric function and $\Re \{z\}$ denotes the real part of $z$.

It is also possible to create k-noids with openings in different directions and sizes, k-noids corresponding to the platonic solids and k-noids with handles.
