= Capillary condensation =

Ability of porous media to condense liquid from an adsorbed vapor

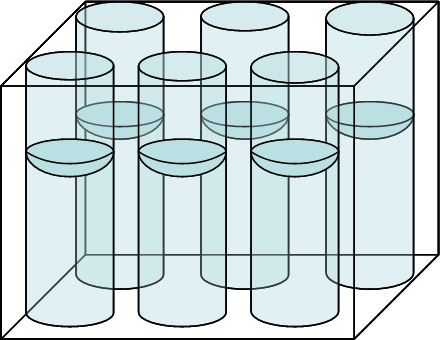
Figure 1: An example of a porous structure exhibiting capillary condensation.

In materials science and biology, capillary condensation is the "process by which multilayer adsorption from the vapor [phase] into a porous medium proceeds to the point at which pore spaces become filled with condensed liquid from the vapor [phase]." The unique aspect of capillary condensation is that vapor condensation occurs below the saturation vapor pressure, P_{sat}, of the pure liquid. This result is due to an increased number of van der Waals interactions between vapor phase molecules inside the confined space of a capillary. Once condensation has occurred, a meniscus immediately forms at the liquid-vapor interface which allows for equilibrium below the saturation vapor pressure. Meniscus formation is dependent on the surface tension of the liquid and the shape of the capillary, as shown by the Young–Laplace equation. As with any liquid-vapor interface involving a meniscus, the Kelvin equation provides a relation for the difference between the equilibrium vapor pressure and the saturation vapor pressure. A capillary does not necessarily have to be a tubular, closed shape, but can be any confined space with respect to its surroundings.

Capillary condensation is an important factor in both naturally occurring and synthetic porous structures. In these structures, scientists use the concept of capillary condensation to determine pore size distribution and surface area through adsorption isotherms. Synthetic applications such as sintering of materials are also highly dependent on bridging effects resulting from capillary condensation. In contrast to the advantages of capillary condensation, it can also cause many problems in materials science applications such as atomic-force microscopy and microelectromechanical systems.

== Kelvin equation ==
The Kelvin equation can be used to describe the phenomenon of capillary condensation due to the presence of a curved meniscus.

$$\ln\frac{P_v}{P_{sat}}=-\frac{2H\gamma V_l}{RT}\$$

Where...

$\ P_v$ = equilibrium vapor pressure
$\ P_{sat}$ = saturation vapor pressure
$\ H$ = mean curvature of meniscus
$\ \gamma$ = liquid/vapor surface tension
$\ V_l$ = liquid molar volume
$\ R$ = ideal gas constant
$\ T$ = temperature

This equation, shown above, governs all equilibrium systems involving meniscus and provides mathematical reasoning for the fact that condensation of a given species occurs below the saturation vapor pressure (P_{v} < P_{sat}) inside a capillary. At the heart of the Kelvin equation is the pressure difference between the liquid and vapor phases, which comes as a contrast to traditional phase diagrams where phase equilibrium occurs at a single pressure, known as P_{sat}, for a given temperature. This pressure drop ($\scriptstyle \Delta P$) is due solely to the liquid/vapor surface tension and curvature of the meniscus, as described in the Young–Laplace equation.

$$\ \Delta P = 2H\gamma$$

In the Kelvin equation, the saturation vapor pressure, surface tension, and molar volume are all inherent properties of the species at equilibrium and are considered constants with respect to the system. Temperature is also a constant in the Kelvin equation as it is a function of the saturation vapor pressure and vice versa. Therefore, the variables that govern capillary condensation most are the equilibrium vapor pressure and the mean curvature of the meniscus.

=== Dependence of P_{v}/P_{sat} ===
The relation of equilibrium vapor pressure to the saturation vapor pressure can be thought of as a relative humidity measurement for the atmosphere. As P_{v}/P_{sat} increases, vapor will continue to condense inside a given capillary. If P_{v}/P_{sat} decreases, liquid will begin to evaporate into the atmosphere as vapor molecules. The figure below demonstrates four different systems in which P_{v}/P_{sat} is increasing from left to right.

Figure 2: Four different capillary systems with increasing P_{v} from A to D.

System A → P_{v}=0, no vapor is present in the system

System B → P_{v}=P_{1}<P_{sat}, capillary condensation occurs and liquid/vapor equilibrium is reached

System C → P_{v}=P_{2}<P_{sat}, P_{1}<P_{2}, as vapor pressure is increased condensation continues in order to satisfy the Kelvin equation

System D → P_{v}=P_{max}<P_{sat}, vapor pressure is increased to its maximum allowed value and the pore is filled completely

This figure is used to demonstrate the concept that by increasing the vapor pressure in a given system, more condensation will occur. In a porous medium, capillary condensation will always occur if P_{v}≠0.

=== Dependence on curvature ===
The Kelvin equation indicates that as P_{v}/P_{sat} increases inside a capillary, the radius of curvature will also increase, creating a flatter interface. (Note: This is not to say that larger radii of curvature result in more vapor condensation. See the discussion on contact angle below.) Figure 2 above demonstrates this dependence in a simple situation whereby the capillary radius is expanding toward the opening of the capillary and thus vapor condensation occurs smoothly over a range of vapor pressures. In a parallel situation, where the capillary radius is constant throughout its height, vapor condensation would occur much more rapidly, reaching the equilibrium radius of curvature (Kelvin radius) as quickly as possible. This dependence on pore geometry and curvature can result in hysteresis and vastly different liquid/vapor equilibria over very small ranges in pressure.

It is also worthy to mention that different pore geometries result in different types of curvature. In scientific studies of capillary condensation, the hemispherical meniscus situation (that resulting from a perfectly cylindrical pore) is most often investigated due to its simplicity. Cylindrical menisci are also useful systems because they typically result from scratches, cuts, and slit-type capillaries in surfaces. Many other types of curvature are possible and equations for the curvature of menisci are readily available at numerous sources. Those for the hemispherical and cylindrical menisci are shown below.

General Curvature Equation:

$$\ H = \frac{1}{2}(\frac{1}{R_1}+\frac{1}{R_2})$$

Cylinder: $\ R_1 = r$ $\ R_2 = \infty$

$$\ H = \frac{1}{2r}$$

Hemisphere: $\ R_1 = r$ $\ R_2 = r$

$$\ H = \frac{1}{r}$$

=== Dependence on contact angle ===
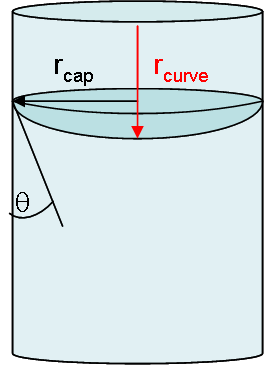
Figure 3: Figure demonstrating the meaning of contact angle inside a capillary as well as the radius of curvature for a meniscus.

Contact angle, or wetting angle, is a very important parameter in real systems where perfect wetting ($\ \theta$ = 0^{o}) is hardly ever achieved. The Young equation provides reasoning for contact angle involvement in capillary condensation. The Young Equation explains that the surface tension between the liquid and vapor phases is scaled to the cosine of the contact angle. As shown in the figure to the right, the contact angle between a condensed liquid and the inner wall of a capillary can affect the radius of curvature a great deal. For this reason, contact angle is coupled inherently to the curvature term of the Kelvin equation. As the contact angle increases, the radius of curvature will increase as well. This is to say that a system with perfect wetting will exhibit a larger amount of liquid in its pores than a system with non-perfect wetting ($\ \theta$ > 0^{o}). Also, in systems where $\ \theta$ = 0^{o} the radius of curvature is equal to the capillary radius. Due to these complications caused by contact angle, scientific studies are often designed to assume $\ \theta$ = 0^{o}.

== Non-uniform pore effects ==
=== Odd pore geometries ===
In both naturally occurring and synthetic porous structures, the geometry of pores and capillaries is almost never perfectly cylindrical. Often, porous media contain networks of capillaries, much like a sponge. Since pore geometry affects the shape and curvature of an equilibrium meniscus, the Kelvin equation could be represented differently every time the meniscus changes along a "snake-like" capillary. This makes the analysis via the Kelvin equation complicated very quickly. Adsorption isotherm studies utilizing capillary condensation are still the main method for determining pore size and shape. With advancements in synthetic techniques and instrumentation, very well ordered porous structures are now available which circumvent the problem of odd-pore geometries in engineered systems.

=== Hysteresis ===
Non-uniform pore geometries often lead to differences in adsorption and desorption pathways within a capillary. This deviation in the two is called a hysteresis and is characteristic of many path dependent processes. For example, if a capillary's radius increases sharply, then capillary condensation (adsorption) will cease until an equilibrium vapor pressure is reached which satisfies the larger pore radius. However, during evaporation (desorption), liquid will remain filled to the larger pore radius until an equilibrium vapor pressure that satisfies the smaller pore radius is reached. The resulting plot of adsorbed volume versus relative humidity yields a hysteresis "loop." This loop is seen in all hysteresis governed processes and gives direct meaning the term "path dependent." The concept of hysteresis was explained indirectly in the curvature section of this article; however, here we are speaking in terms of a single capillary instead of a distribution of random pore sizes.

Hysteresis in capillary condensation has been shown to be minimized at higher temperatures.

=== Accounting for small capillary radii ===
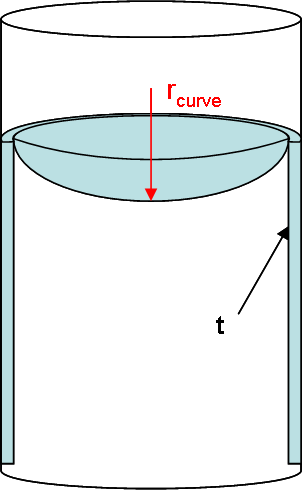
Figure 4: Figure explaining the term "statistical film thickness" in the context of very small capillary radii.

Capillary condensation in pores with r<10 nm is often difficult to describe using the Kelvin equation. This is because the Kelvin equation underestimates the size of the pore radius when working on the nanometer scale. To account for this underestimation, the idea of a statistical film thickness, t, has often been invoked. The idea centers around the fact that a very small layer of adsorbed liquid coats the capillary surface before any meniscus is formed and is thus part of the estimated pore radius. The figure to the left gives an explanation of the statistical film thickness in relation to the radius of curvature for the meniscus. This adsorbed film layer is always present; however, at large pore radii the term becomes so small compared to the radius of curvature that it can be neglected. At very small pore radii though, the film thickness becomes an important factor in accurately determining the pore radius.

== Capillary adhesion ==
=== Bridging effects ===
Figure 5: Figure demonstrating the bridging between two spheres due to capillary condensation.

Starting from the assumption that two wetted surfaces will stick together, e.g. the bottom of a glass cup on a wet counter top, will help to explain the idea of how capillary condensation causes two surfaces to bridge together. When looking at the Kelvin equation, where relative humidity comes into play, condensation that occurs below P_{sat} will cause adhesion. However it is most often ignored that the adhesive force is dependent only on the particle radius (for wettable, spherical particles, at least) and therefore independent of the relative vapor pressure or humidity, within very wide limits. This is a consequence of the fact that particle surfaces are not smooth on the molecular scale, therefore condensation only occurs about the scattered points of actual contacts between the two spheres. Experimentally, however it is seen that capillary condensation plays a large role in bridging or adhering multiple surfaces or particles together. This can be important in the adhesion of dust and powders. There is a difference between bridging and adhesion. While both are a consequence of capillary condensation, adhesion implies that the two particles or surfaces will not be able to separate without a large amount of force applied, or complete integration, as in sintering; bridging implies the formation of a meniscus that brings two surfaces or particles in contact with each other without direct integration or loss of individuality.

== Real-world applications and problems ==
=== Atomic-force microscopy ===
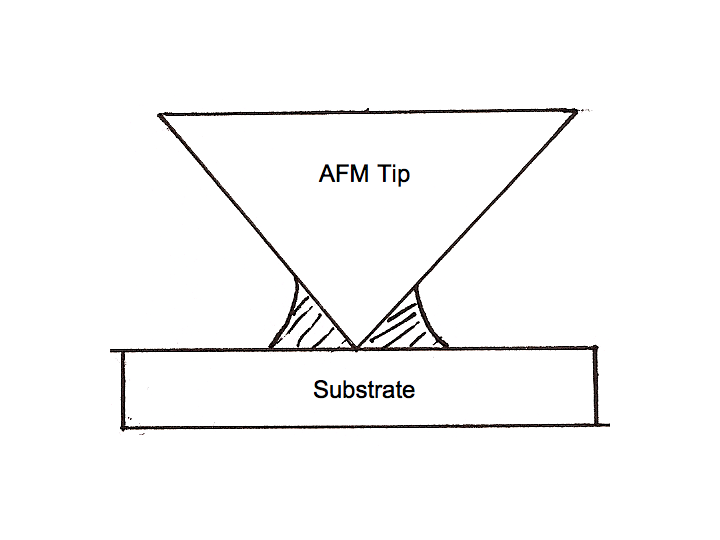
Figure 6: Meniscus formation between an AFM tip and a substrate

Capillary condensation bridges two surfaces together, with the formation of a meniscus, as is stated above. In the case of atomic-force microscopy (AFM) a capillary bridge of water can form between the tip and the surface, especially in cases of a hydrophilic surface in a humid environment when the AFM is operated in contact mode. While studies have been done on the formation of the meniscus between the tip and the sample, no specific conclusion can be drawn as to the optimum height away from the sample the tip can be without meniscus formation. Scientific studies have been done on the relationship between relative humidity and the geometry of the meniscus created by capillary condensation. One particular study, done by Weeks, illustrated that with the increase in relative humidity, there is a large increase in the size of the meniscus. This study also states that no meniscus formation is observed when the relative humidity is less than 70%, although there is uncertainty in this conclusion due to limits of resolution.

The formation of the meniscus is the basis of the Dip-Pen Nanolithography technique.

=== Sintering ===
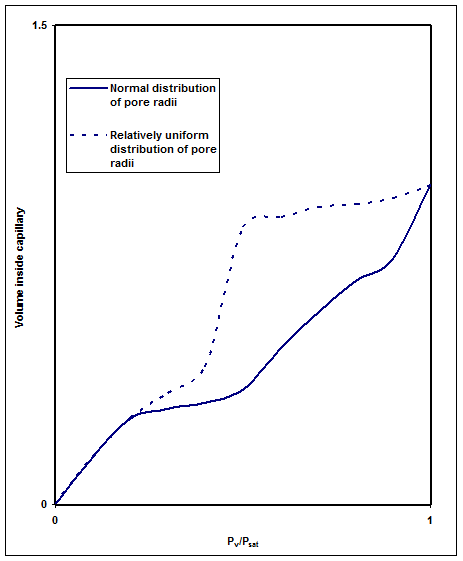
Figure 7: Capillary condensation profile showing a sudden increase in adsorbed volume due to a uniform capillary radius (dashed path) among a distribution of pores and that of a normal distribution of capillary radii (solid path)

Sintering is a common practice used widely with both metals and ceramic materials. Sintering is a direct application of capillary condensation, because of the adhesion effects of dust and powders. This application can be seen directly in sol-gel thin film synthesis. The sol-gel is a colloid solution which is placed on a substrate, usually through a dip-coating method. After being placed onto the substrate, a source of heat is applied to evaporate all undesired liquid. While the liquid is evaporating, the particles that were once in solution adhere to each other, thus forming a thin film.

=== MEMS ===
Microelectromechanical systems (MEMS) are used in a number of different applications and have become increasingly more prevalent in nanoscale applications. However, due to their small size they run into problems with stiction, caused by capillary condensation among other forces. Intense research in the area of Microelectromechanical systems has been focused on finding ways to reduce stiction in the fabrication of Microelectromechanical systems and when they are being used. Srinivasan et al. did a study in 1998 looking at applying different types of Self-assembled monolayers (SAMs) to the surfaces of Microelectromechanical systems in hopes of reducing stiction or getting rid of it altogether. They found that using OTS (octadecyltrichlorosilane) coatings reduced both types of stiction.

=== Pore size distribution ===
Pores that are not of the same size will fill at different values of pressure, with the smaller ones filling first. This difference in filling rate can be a beneficial application of capillary condensation. Many materials have different pore sizes with ceramics being one of the most commonly encountered. In materials with different pore sizes, curves can be constructed similar to Figure 7. A detailed analysis of the shape of these isotherms is done using the Kelvin equation. This enables the pore size distribution to be determined. While this is a relatively simple method of analyzing the isotherms, a more in depth analysis of the isotherms is done using the BET method. Another method of determining the pore size distribution is by using a procedure known as Mercury Injection Porosimetry. This uses the volume of mercury taken up by the solid as the pressure increases to create the same isotherms mentioned above. An application where pore size is beneficial is in regards to oil recovery. When recovering oil from tiny pores, it is useful to inject gas and water into the pore. The gas will then occupy the space where the oil once was, mobilizing the oil, and then the water will displace some of the oil forcing it to leave the pore.

== See also ==
- Adsorption
- Atomic-force microscopy
- BET theory
- Capillarity
- Curvature
- Capillary bridges
- Disjoining pressure
- Kelvin equation
- Self-assembled monolayers
- Sintering
- Microelectromechanical systems
- Meniscus (liquid)
- Sol-gel
- Colloid
- Ceramic
