= Reilly formula =

In the mathematical field of Riemannian geometry, the Reilly formula is an important identity, discovered by Robert Reilly in 1977. It says that, given a smooth Riemannian manifold-with-boundary (M, g) and a smooth function u on M, one has

$$\int_{\partial M}\left(H\Big(\frac{\partial u}{\partial\nu}\Big)^2+2\frac{\partial u}{\partial\nu}\Delta^{\partial M}u+h\big(\nabla^{\partial M}u,\nabla^{\partial M}u\big)\right)=\int_M \Big((\Delta u)^2-|\nabla\nabla u|^2-\operatorname{Ric}(\nabla u,\nabla u)\Big),$$

in which h is the second fundamental form of the boundary of M, H is its mean curvature, and ν is its unit normal vector. This is often used in combination with the observation

$$|\nabla\nabla u|^2=\frac{1}{n}(\Delta u)^2+\Big|\nabla\nabla u-\frac{1}{n}(\Delta u)g\Big|^2\geq\frac{1}{n}(\Delta u)^2,$$

with the consequence that

$$\int_{\partial M}\left(H\Big(\frac{\partial u}{\partial\nu}\Big)^2+2\frac{\partial u}{\partial\nu}\Delta^{\partial M}u+h\big(\nabla^{\partial M}u,\nabla^{\partial M}u\big)\right)\leq\int_M \Big(\frac{n-1}{n}(\Delta u)^2-\operatorname{Ric}(\nabla u,\nabla u)\Big).$$

This is particularly useful since one can now make use of the solvability of the Dirichlet problem for the Laplacian to make useful choices for u. Applications include eigenvalue estimates in spectral geometry and the study of submanifolds of constant mean curvature.
