= Wente torus =

In differential geometry, a Wente torus is an immersed torus in $\mathbb{R}^3$ of constant mean curvature, discovered by Henry C. Wente (1986). It is a counterexample to the conjecture of Heinz Hopf that every closed, compact, constant-mean-curvature surface is a sphere (though this is true if the surface is embedded). There are similar examples known for every positive genus.
