= Henry C. Wente =

American mathematician (1936–2020)

Henry Christian Wente (August 18, 1936 – January 20, 2020) was an American mathematician, known for his 1997 discovery of the Wente torus, an immersed constant-mean-curvature surface whose existence disproved a conjecture of Heinz Hopf.

Wente obtained both his bachelor's degree and his Ph.D. from Harvard University. He completed his doctorate in 1966, under the supervision of Garrett Birkhoff. He was a distinguished professor emeritus of mathematics at the University of Toledo, which he joined in 1971. In 1988 he was an Invited Speaker at the International Congress of Mathematicians (ICM) in Berkeley, California. In 2012 he became a fellow of the American Mathematical Society.

== Selected publications ==
=== Articles ===
- —— (1971). "An existence theorem for surfaces of constant mean curvature". Bulletin of the American Mathematical Society. 77 (2): 200–203. doi:10.1090/S0002-9904-1971-12679-4. MR 0268743.
- —— (1971). "A general existence theorem for surfaces of constant mean curvature". Mathematische Zeitschrift. 120 (3): 277–288. doi:10.1007/BF01117500.
- Hildebrandt, S.; —— (1973). "Variational problems with obstacles and a volume constraint". Mathematische Zeitschrift. 135: 55–68. doi:10.1007/BF01214305.
- —— (1974). "The Dirichlet problem with a volume constraint". Manuscripta Mathematica. 11 (2): 141–157. doi:10.1007/BF01184954.
- —— (1975). "The differential equation $\Delta$x=2H(x_{u} $\wedge$ x_{v}) with vanishing boundary values". Proceedings of the American Mathematical Society. 50 (1): 131–137. doi:10.2307/2040528. JSTOR 2040528. MR 0374673.
- Steffen, Klaus; —— (1978). "The non-existence of branch points in solutions to certain classes of plateau type variational problems". Mathematische Zeitschrift. 163 (3): 211–238. doi:10.1007/BF01174896.
- —— (1980). "Large solutions to the volume constrained plateau problem". Archive for Rational Mechanics and Analysis. 75 (1): 59–77. Bibcode:1980ArRMA..75...59W. doi:10.1007/BF00284621.
- —— (1982). "The symmetry of rotating fluid bodies". Manuscripta Mathematica. 39 (2–3): 287–296. doi:10.1007/BF01165793.
- —— (1985). "A counterexample in 3-space to a conjecture of H. Hopf". Arbeitstagung Bonn 1984. Lecture Notes in Mathematics. Vol. 1111. pp. 421–429. doi:10.1007/BFb0084601. ISBN 978-3-540-15195-1.
- —— (1987). "Immersed Tori of Constant Mean Curvature in $\mathbb{R}^3$". Variational Methods for Free Surface Interfaces. pp. 13–26. doi:10.1007/978-1-4612-4656-5_2. ISBN 978-1-4612-9101-5.
- —— (1987). "Twisted Tori of Constant Mean Curvature in $\mathbb{R}^3$". Seminar on New Results in Nonlinear Partial Differential Equations. pp. 1–36. doi:10.1007/978-3-322-85049-2_1. ISBN 978-3-322-85051-5.
- Sterling, I.; —— (1993). "Existence and Classification of Constant Mean Curvature Multibubbletons of Finite and Infinite Type". Indiana University Mathematics Journal. 42 (4): 1239–1266. doi:10.1512/iumj.1993.42.42057. JSTOR 24897145.
- —— (1995). "The capillary problem for an infinite trough". Calculus of Variations and Partial Differential Equations. 3 (2): 155–192. doi:10.1007/BF01205004.
- —— (1999). "A surprising bubble catastrophe". Pacific Journal of Mathematics. 189 (2): 339–375. doi:10.2140/pjm.1999.189.339.
- —— (2002). "Constant mean curvature surfaces of annular type". Calculus of Variations and Partial Differential Equations. 14 (2): 193–211. doi:10.1007/s005260100097.
- —— (2008). "The Floating Ball Paradox". Journal of Mathematical Fluid Mechanics. 10 (4): 569–582. Bibcode:2008JMFM...10..569W. doi:10.1007/s00021-007-0251-0.
- —— (2011). "Exotic Capillary Tubes". Journal of Mathematical Fluid Mechanics. 13 (3): 355–370. Bibcode:2011JMFM...13..355W. doi:10.1007/s00021-010-0027-9.

=== Books ===
- —— (1992). Constant Mean Curvature Immersions of Enneper Type. American Mathematical Soc. ISBN 978-0-8218-2536-5.
