= Unduloid =

Computer generated unduloid

In geometry, an unduloid, or onduloid, is a surface with constant nonzero mean curvature obtained as a surface of revolution of an elliptic catenary: that is, by rolling an ellipse along a fixed line, tracing the focus, and revolving the resulting curve around the line. In 1841 Delaunay proved that the only surfaces of revolution with constant mean curvature were the surfaces obtained by rotating the roulettes of the conics. These are the plane, cylinder, sphere, the catenoid, the unduloid and nodoid.

== Formula ==
Let $\operatorname{sn}(u,k)$ represent the normal Jacobi sine function and $\operatorname{dn}(u,k)$ be the normal Jacobi elliptic function and let $\operatorname{F}(z,k)$ represent the normal elliptic integral of the first kind and $\operatorname{E}(z,k)$ represent the normal elliptic integral of the second kind. Let a be the length of the ellipse's major axis, and e be the eccentricity of the ellipse. Let k be a fixed value between 0 and 1 called the modulus.

Given these variables,

$$\operatorname{x}(u) = -a(1-e)( \operatorname{F}(\operatorname{sn}(u,k),k) + \operatorname{F}(1,k)) - a(1+e)( \operatorname{E}( \operatorname{sn}(u,k),k) + \operatorname{E}(1,k)) \,$$

$$\operatorname{y}(u) = a(1+e)\operatorname{dn}(u,k) \,$$

The formula for the surface of revolution that is the unduloid is then

$$\operatorname{X}(u,v) = \langle \operatorname{x}(u), \operatorname{y}(u) \cos(v), \operatorname{y}(u) \sin(v)\rangle \,$$

== Properties ==
One interesting property of the unduloid is that the mean curvature is constant. In fact, the mean curvature across the entire surface is always the reciprocal of twice the major axis length: 1/(2a).

Also, geodesics on an unduloid obey the Clairaut relation, and their behavior is therefore predictable.

== Occurrence in material science ==
Unduloids are not a common pattern in nature. However, there are a few circumstances in which they form. First documented in 1970, passing a strong electric current through a thin (0.16—1.0mm), horizontally mounted, hard-drawn (non-tempered) silver wire will result in unduloids forming along its length. This phenomenon was later discovered to also occur in molybdenum wire. Unduloids have also been formed with ferrofluids. By passing a current axially through a cylinder coated with a viscous magnetic fluid film, the magnetic dipoles of the fluid interact with the magnetic field of the current, creating a droplet pattern along the cylinder’s length.
