= Nodoid =

Type of surface of revolution

Half of a nodoid surface.

In differential geometry, a nodoid is a surface of revolution with constant nonzero mean curvature obtained by rolling a hyperbola along a fixed line, tracing the focus, and revolving the resulting nodary curve around the line.
