= Constant-mean-curvature surface =

Surface with constant mean curvature

Nodoid, a surface with constant mean curvature

Unduloid, a surface with constant mean curvature

In differential geometry, constant-mean-curvature (CMC) surfaces are surfaces with constant mean curvature. This includes minimal surfaces as a subset, but typically they are treated as special case.

Note that these surfaces are generally different from constant Gaussian curvature surfaces, with the important exception of the sphere.

== History ==
In 1841 Delaunay proved that the only surfaces of revolution with constant mean curvature were the surfaces obtained by rotating the roulettes of the conics. These are the plane, cylinder, sphere, the catenoid, the unduloid and nodoid.

In 1853 J. H. Jellet showed that if $S$ is a compact star-shaped surface in $\R^3$ with constant mean curvature, then it is the standard sphere. Subsequently, A. D. Alexandrov proved that a compact embedded surface in $\R^3$ with constant mean curvature $H \neq 0$ must be a sphere, and H. Hopf proved that a sphere immersed in $\R^3$ with constant mean curvature $H \neq 0$ must be a standard sphere. Based on this H. Hopf conjectured in 1956 that any immersed compact orientable constant mean curvature hypersurface in $\R^n$ must be a standard embedded $n-1$ sphere. This conjecture was disproven in 1982 by Wu-Yi Hsiang using a counterexample in $\R^4$. In 1984 Henry C. Wente constructed the Wente torus, an immersion into $\R^3$ of a torus with constant mean curvature.

Up until this point it had seemed that CMC surfaces were rare. Using gluing techniques, in 1987 Nikolaos Kapouleas constructed a plethora of examples of complete immersed CMC surfaces in $\R^3$ with most topological types and at least two ends. Subsequently, Kapouleas constructed compact CMC surfaces in $\R^3$ with each genus bigger than one. In particular gluing methods appear to allow combining CMC surfaces fairly arbitrarily. Delaunay surfaces can also be combined with immersed "bubbles", retaining their CMC properties.

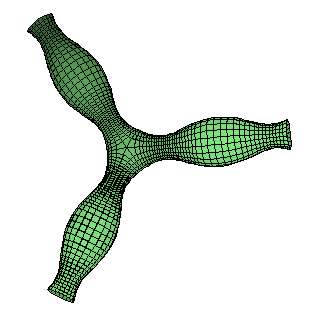
Equal neck sizes

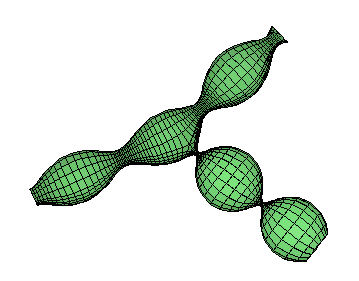
Unequal neck sizes

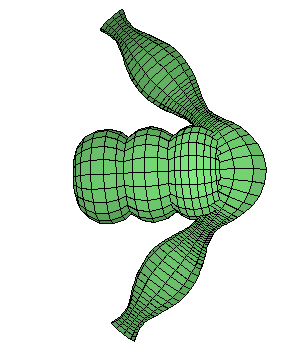
With nodoid end

Triunduloids with different neck sizes. As neck sizes are varied the asymptotic directions change.

Meeks showed that there are no embedded CMC surfaces with just one end in $\R^3$. Korevaar, Kusner and Solomon proved that a complete embedded CMC surface will have ends asymptotic to unduloids. Each end carries a $n(2\pi-n)$ "force" along the asymptotic axis of the unduloid (where n is the circumference of the necks), the sum of which must be balanced for the surface to exist. Current work involves classification of families of embedded CMC surfaces in terms of their moduli spaces. In particular, for $k \geq 3$ coplanar k-unduloids of genus 0 satisfy $\sum_{i=1}^k n_i \leq (k-1)\pi$ for odd k, and $\sum_{i=1}^k n_i \leq k\pi$ for even k. At most k − 2 ends can be cylindrical.

== Generation methods ==
=== Representation formula ===
Like for minimal surfaces, there exist a close link to harmonic functions. An oriented surface $S$ in $\R^3$ has constant mean curvature if and only if its Gauss map is a harmonic map. Kenmotsu’s representation formula is the counterpart to the Weierstrass–Enneper parameterization of minimal surfaces:

Let $V$ be an open simply connected subset of $\C$ and $H$ be an arbitrary non-zero real constant. Suppose $\phi: V \rightarrow \C$ is a harmonic function into the Riemann sphere. If $\phi_{\bar z} \neq 0$ then $X : V \rightarrow R$ defined by

$$X(z) = \Re \int_{z_0}^z X_z(z')\,dz'$$

with

$$X_z(z)=\frac{-1}{H(1+\phi(z)\bar\phi(z))^2} \left \{(1-\phi(z)^2, i(1+\phi(z)^2), 2\phi(z)) \frac{\bar{\partial\phi}}{\partial \bar z}(z) \right \}$$

for $z \in V$ is a regular surface having $\phi$ as Gauss map and mean curvature $H$.

For $\phi(z)=-1/\bar z$ and $H=1$ this produces the sphere. $\phi(z)=-e^{ix}$ and $H=1/2$ gives a cylinder where $z=x+iv$.

=== Conjugate cousin method ===
Lawson showed in 1970 that each CMC surface in $\R^3$has an isometric "cousin" minimal surface in $\mathbb{S}^3$. This allows constructions starting from geodesic polygons in $\mathbb{S}^3$, which are spanned by a minimal patch that can be extended into a complete surface by reflection, and then turned into a CMC surface.

=== CMC Tori ===
Hitchin, Pinkall, Sterling and Bobenko showed that all constant mean curvature immersions of a 2-torus into the space forms $\mathbb{R}^3, \mathbb{S}^3$ and $\mathbb{H}^3$ can be described in purely algebro-geometric data. This can be extended to a subset of CMC immersions of the plane which are of finite type. More precisely there is an explicit bijection between CMC immersions of $\mathbb{R}^2$ into $\mathbb{R}^3, \mathbb{S}^3$ and $\mathbb{H}^3$, and spectral data of the form $(\Sigma, \lambda, \rho, \lambda_1, \lambda_2, L)$ where $\Sigma$ is a hyperelliptic curve called the spectral curve, $\lambda$ is a meromorphic function on $\Sigma$, $\lambda_1$ and $\lambda_2$ are points on $\mathbb{C}\setminus\{0\}$, $\rho$ is an antiholomorphic involution and $L$ is a line bundle on $\Sigma$ obeying certain conditions.

=== Discrete numerical methods ===
Discrete differential geometry can be used to produce approximations to CMC surfaces (or discrete counterparts), typically by minimizing a suitable energy functional.

== Applications ==
CMC surfaces are natural for representations of soap bubbles, since they have the curvature corresponding to a nonzero pressure difference.

Besides macroscopic bubble surfaces CMC surfaces are relevant for the shape of the gas–liquid interface on a superhydrophobic surface.

Like triply periodic minimal surfaces there has been interest in periodic CMC surfaces as models for block copolymers where the different components have a nonzero interfacial energy or tension. CMC analogs to the periodic minimal surfaces have been constructed, producing unequal partitions of space. CMC structures have been observed in ABC triblock copolymers.

In architecture CMC surfaces are relevant for air-supported structures such as inflatable domes and enclosures, as well as a source of flowing organic shapes.

== See also ==
- Double bubble conjecture
- Free surface
- Minimal surface
