= Xuehua Zhang =

Chinese-Canadian materials scientist

Xuehua Zhang is a Chinese-Canadian chemical engineer known for her research on the nanoscale behavior of solid-liquid interfaces and especially on nanobubbles, nanodroplets, and cold plasma. She is a professor in the Chemical and Materials Engineering Department at the University of Alberta, where she holds a tier 1 Canada Research Chair in Soft Matter and Interfaces.

== Education and career ==
Zhang completed a Ph.D. in biomedical engineering in China, at Shanghai Jiao Tong University. She was a postdoctoral researcher in Australia as an Endeavour Research Fellow at the Australian National University in 2005 and as a postdoctoral fellow, ARC Postdoctoral Fellow, and ARC Future Fellow at the University of Melbourne, from 2006 to 2016. She also worked as a researcher at the University of Twente, in the Netherlands, in 2012, began an affiliation with the University of Twente as an adjunct professor in 2014, and worked as an associate professor at the Royal Melbourne Institute of Technology from 2014 to 2017. She moved to her present position at the University of Alberta in 2017.

== Recognition ==
Zhang was awarded a tier 1 Canada Research Chair in 2018. She was elected to the Canadian Academy of Engineering in 2025, and was a recipient of the International Union of Pure and Applied Chemistry (IUPAC) 2025 Awards for Distinguished Women in Chemistry or Chemical Engineering.
