= List of optofluidics researchers =

This is a list of researchers in optofluidics, a research and technology area that combines microfluidics and optics and has applications in displays, biosensors, lab-on-chip devices, lenses, and molecular imaging and energy.

== Current research and technologies ==
There are numerous research groups worldwide working on optofluidics, including those listed below.

Country	University / Institute	Group	Topic
Australia	University of Sydney	CUDOS (Eggleton)	Photonic Crystals.
Austria	Johannes Kepler University Linz	Institute for Microelectronics and Microsensors (Jakoby)	Fluidic sensors, Miniaturized IR sensor systems, microfluidic actuators.
Canada	University of Toronto	Sinton Group	biosensors, energy.
Canada	University of Toronto	Biophotonics Group (Levy)	Photonic crystals, sensors.
Canada	The University of British Columbia	MiNa Group	Integrated optofluidics, sensors.
Canada	Queen's University	Escobedo Group	Optical Diagnostics, Micro/Nano-devices.
Denmark	Danish Technical University	Kristensen Group	Polymer optofluidics, lasers, single molecule analysis.
Israel	Hebrew University	NanoOpto Group (Levy)	Optical Resonators, Plasmonics.
Iran	Sharif University of Technology	M.S. Saidi Group	Optical Diagnostic Methods, Biofluids.
Japan	University of Tokyo	Goda Lab	Imaging flow cytometry, single-cell analysis.
South Korea	Seoul National University	Biophotonics and Nano Engineering Lab (Kwon)	Directed assembly, sensors, structural color.
South Korea	KAIST	Superlattice Nanomaterials Lab (Yang)	Optofluidic materials, SERS sensors.
Germany	Technische Universität Berlin	Institute of Optics and Atomic Physics	Glass surface and volume structuring.
Germany	University of Bremen	IMSAS Sensors Institute (Vellekoop group)	Optofluidic devices, sensors, microfluidics
Germany	Karlsruhe Institute of Technology	Biophotonic Sensors Group (Mappes)	Sensors, fabrication and integration techniques.
Germany	University of Münster	Nonlinear Photonics Group (Denz)	Optical tweezing and its integration into optofluidic setups, direct-laser-writing of optofluidic components
Switzerland	EPFL	Psaltis Group	optofluidic switches, imaging, energy.
Singapore	Nanyang Technological University	A.Q. Liu Group	Optofluidic waveguides, lab-on-a-chip devices.
Singapore	Nanyang Technological University	N.T. Nguyen Group	Diagnostics, Transport.
(in Spanish)	ICFO-The Institute of Photonic Sciences	Quidant group	LSPR sensing, Plasmonic tweezers.
Taiwan	National Taiwan University	Bio-Optofluidic System Lab	optical sensing for dynamic cellular phenotyping.
Taiwan	National Yang Ming Chiao Tung University	Integrated Biomedical and Optofluidic Systems Lab	optofluidic sensing, thermophoresis, SERS, LSPR.
Turkey	Koç University	Nano-Optics Research Lab.	Droplet resonators, optofluidic waveguides, optical trapping and manipulation.
United Kingdom	University of St Andrews	Optical Manipulation Group	Optofluidic sensing, trapping, Raman spectroscopy, cell sorting, photoporation
United Kingdom	University of St Andrews	Optical Manipulation Group	Optofluidic sensing, trapping, Raman spectroscopy, cell sorting, photoporation
United Kingdom	University of Cambridge	Optofluidics Group (Euser Group)	Optofluidics with hollow-core photonic crystal fibres.
United States	Purdue University	Steve Wereley Group	Holographic optical tweezing, Optoelctrokinetic Patterning, Programmable Microfluidics, Micro-PIV.
United States	Cornell University	Erickson Group	nanophotonic tweezing, optofluidic switches, biosensors, energy.
United States	UC Santa Cruz	Applied Optics Group	Arrow waveguides, single molecule optofluidics.
United States	Brigham Young University	Hawkins Research Group	Optofluidic waveguides, single molecule optical analysis.
United States	Caltech	Yang Biophotonics Group	Optofluidic Microscopy, Imaging, OCT.
United States	UC San Diego	Ultrafast and Nanoscale Optics Group (Fainman)	Nanoscale lasers, optofluidic switches, silicon devices.
United States	University of Michigan	Sherman Fan Lab	Optofluidic lasers, SERS, ring resonators.
United States	University of Maryland	White Research Group	Medical diagnostics, SERS, circulating tumor cells.
United States	University of Chicago	The Scherer Group	Optical trapping, active nanoscale plasmonic devices.
United States	Caltech	Nanofabrication Group (Scherer)	Optofluidic Lasers, DNA detection, photonic crystals.
United States	Penn State	BioNEMS Laboratory (Huang)	Optofluidic lenses, plasmonics.
United States	UC Berkeley	BioPOETS (Lee)	Optofluidic transport, SERS, microfluidics.
United States	UC Berkeley	Berkeley Integrated Photonics Lab (Wu)	Optoelectronic tweezers.
United States	UC San Diego	Lo Research Group	Optofluidic flow cytometry.
United States	UIUC	Nano Sensors Group (Cunningham)	Photonic Crystal Sensors, SERS.
United States	Harvard	Crozier Group	Near Field Trapping, SERS
United States	Princeton University	Imaging Physics Group	Microfluidic Tomography, Deconvolution, Superresolution
United States	University of Missouri	Nicole Hashemi Group	Optofluidics, microfluidics, biosensors, diagnostics and therapeutics, energy.
United States	Iowa State University	Attinger Group	Optofluidic transport
United States	Boston University	LINBS (Altug)	Plasmonics, nanohole sensors, high throughput diagnostics
United States	University of Wisconsin, Madison	Micro/nano sensors and actuators group	Liquid tunable microlenses.
Belgium	Vrije Universiteit Brussel	Brussels Photonics Team (B-PHOT)	Polymer optofluidics, biosensors
