= Ozone and biology =

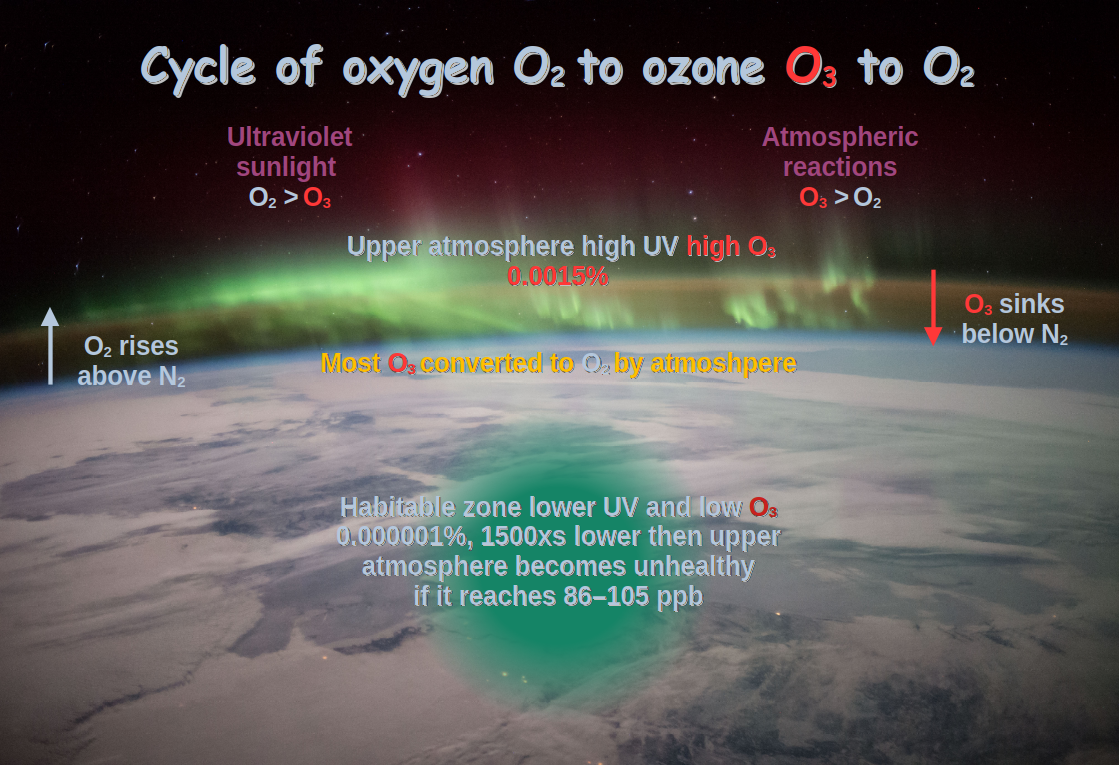
Ozone cycle illustrated over image by NASA astronaut Scott Kelly

Ozone is a ubiquitous yet highly reactive molecule in the atmosphere. Such a highly reactive oxidizer would normally be dangerous to life but ozone's concentration at sea level is usually not high enough to be toxic. The relatively low concentration of ozone in the habitable zone of earth is in part due to ozone being highly reactive with organic molecules. Ozone that has not already reacted with other atmospheric components quickly reacts with organic molecules that frequent the habitable zone. The ozone is also predominantly generated by UV rays in the upper atmosphere, well away from the habitable zone. Ozone is heavier than most of the atmosphere, but by the time the ozone in the upper atmosphere sinks to sea level most has already reacted with other molecules, converting the ozone to oxygen, forming a part of the more general atmospheric circulation.

The distribution of ozone just described is useful through the manipulation of ozone concentrations outside the norms of the habitable zone. Raising ozone concentrations significantly above naturally occurring levels in the habitable zone overwhelms mechanisms that life has evolved to deal with lower concentrations. When ozone comes into contact with cells, viruses, mycoplasmas, prions, amyloids or other organics it breaks them down. The non-selective nature of the oxidation means the ozone has to be well controlled if a specific outcome is required. This can be done by maximizing exposure of the molecules, compounds, proteins, and cells to the ozone that need to be reacted with or destroyed while minimizing exposure to non-targets.

== Ozone delivery ==
=== Naturally in animals ===
Ozone in high concentrations is harmful to animals but they have been found to use small amounts of ozone. The immune system is thought to use ozonolysis by antibodies organizing ^{1} O _{2} allowing H_{2}0_{3} to be produced. Traditionally the role of antibodies was thought to be only specifically binding to pathogenic antigens. That antibodies also produced a useful amount of ozone has been debated and was later shown not to be a clear cut result. Other mechanisms for the use of oxidation to destroy pathogens were found. To date, the initial controversy in the area and the research over the following 20 years has not made the field much clearer. A more recent paper states "Singlet oxygen may be commonly generated in tissues through a range of enzymatic and nonenzymatic reactions.... ozone formation also seems to be important".

The studies just alluded to indicate ozone may be important to the immune system but it is not generated in sufficient concentrations to be lethal to pathogens directly. With such small quantities of ozone being made by organisms, ozone's roles in animals and the mode of action needed to be re-assessed. While not necessarily killing pathogens, even short ozone exposure is shown to destabilize them even after 60 seconds. Such disruption may allow the immune system to access new antigens associated with the pathogen. In this way ozone may act to enhance signalling of the pathogens presence. Ozone's effect on signalling in animals may therefore become more significant than its direct effect as an antibiotic at higher concentrations.

Developments of techniques capable of more accurately monitoring ozone levels inside cells will enable investigation of endogenous ozone in cells, perhaps clarifying how cells use endogenous ozone. Some of the cellular pathways ozone seems to be involved with include:

- The generation of cholesterol carboxyaldehyde
- As an inflammatory mediator.
- To mediate the formation of oxidized low-density lipoprotein.
- While not endogenous to the animals cells, ambient ozone in the lungs can alter the immune response to pathogens.

Though currently a short list it is already apparent that endogenous ozone plays a significant role in mediating reactions in the body. Ozone's endogenous role as a mediator in the body also helps explain why adding exogenous ozone to the body will continue to have unexpected impacts until all the endogenous roles of ozone are fully understood.

=== Artificially by people ===
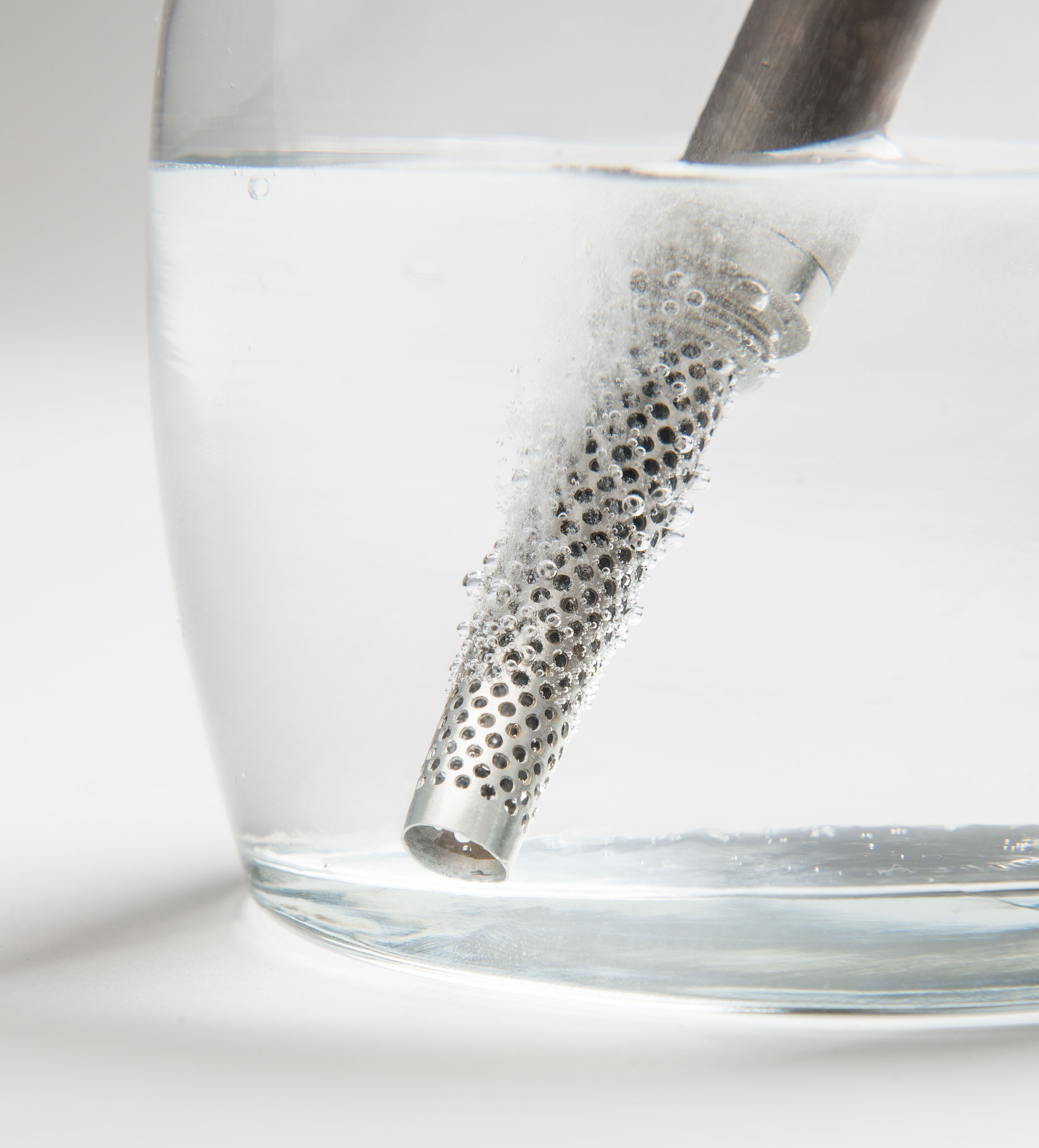
An example of an electrolytic ozone generator at work, in this case it is used to purify tap water of unknown safety, directly in a glass

As a gas in ambient conditions, ozone cannot be delivered in the same way as the more widespread water based oxidizers, disinfectants and antibiotics. Delivering ozone dissolved in liquids is not straight forward as ozone gas has limited solubility in water or oil. When treating the water or other liquids themselves, the solubility is less of a problem as pure ozone gas can be discharged into the liquid until the desired effect is achieved.

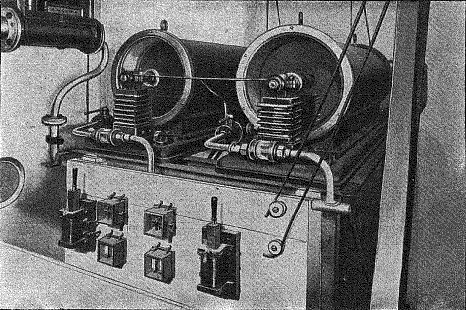
Charvet ozone generators in a laundry circa 1903

When trying to apply ozone already dissolved into a liquid to treat another surface, the lack of solubility is more problematic. The use of nanobubbles of ozone suspended in water or oil helped overcome this problem. Nano-bubbles of ozone are relatively stable and allow for much higher concentrations of ozone to be stably suspended in liquids.

The amount of ozone manufactured for use in the food and other industries is reflected in the considerable effort placed on producing it efficiently in high performance ozone generators. Where non-targeted antibiotic action is required, such as in water purification, it is widely used. Society is requiring the use of fewer chemicals with less toxic byproducts in water purification and food production. As ozone breaks down to oxygen rather than potentially unhealthy compounds it is now being used more widely. Newer developments in food production include controlling microorganism growth, enhancing food safety and extending shelf life.

The reactivity of ozone makes ozone a very general agent for killing pathogens given high enough concentration and time. When used in medical treatments the efficient targeting of ozone to the site where it needs to be active is therefor important. Non-targeted ozone at high concentrations could cause unwanted damage to healthy tissues.

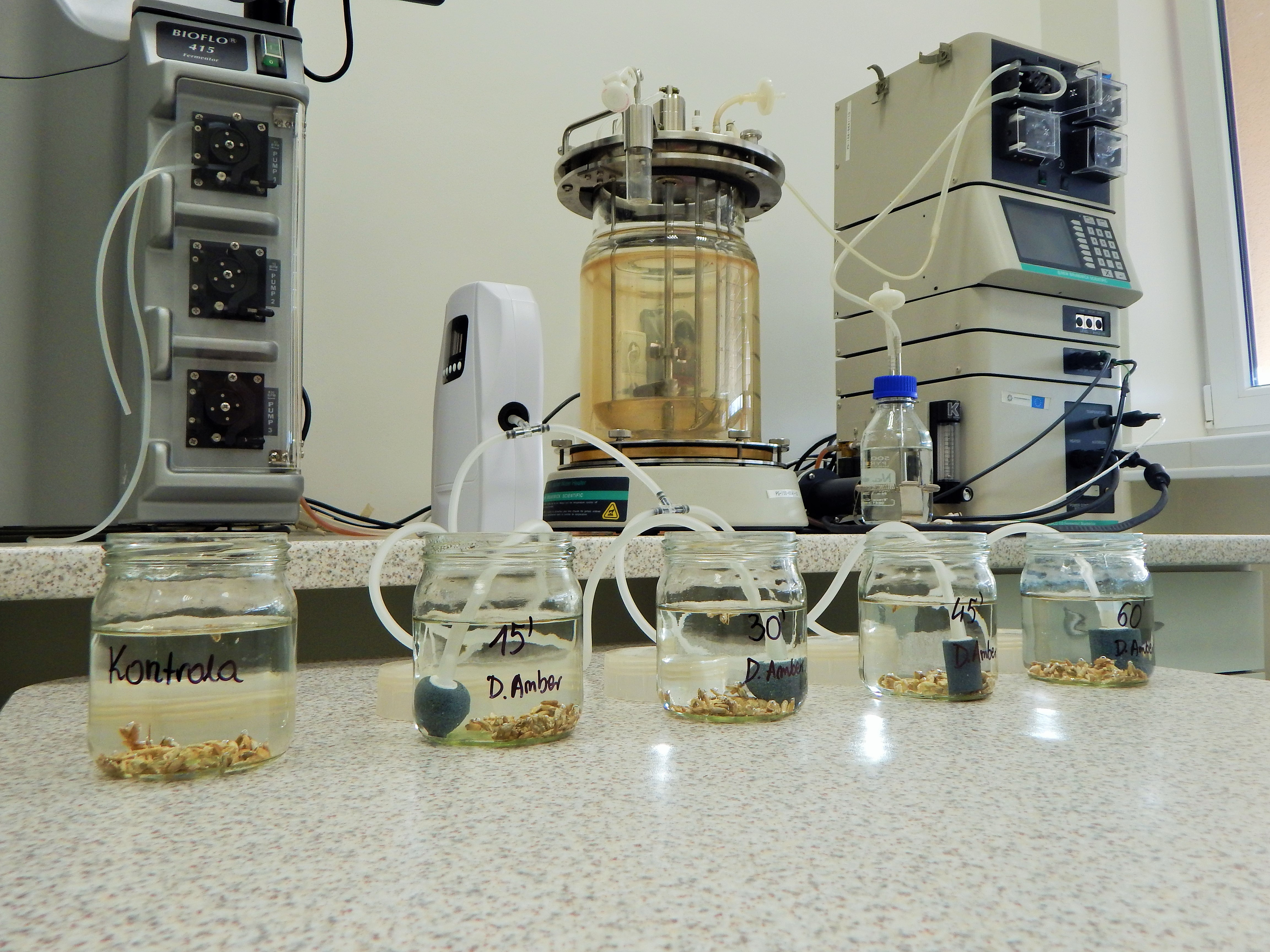
Seed dis-infestation by ozone treatment. The natural coat on the seed is enough to protect the embryo inside from ozone damage

The same reactivity that makes ozone an almost universal killer also makes it easier to be delivered to the right place. Cuticles, epidermis and other layers on the surface of many living things, act as an effective barrier to moderate concentrations of ozone. The natural barriers often last long enough to ensure the higher ozone concentrations have reacted with pathogens and less sensitive materials forming oxygen, before reaching the more sensitive active cells below. The same effective barrier is provided by any reactive surface resulting in occupied rooms houses having significantly lower concentrations of ozone then the out doors, ozone being the least problematic of common contaminants in rooms. Pathogens on cuticles and epidermises can therefore be treated with concentrations of ozone that are fatal without killing the cells beneath. As surfaces such as lungs are not covered by a layer of dead cells, but rather a thin layer of mucous, less protected areas such as eyes and lungs are susceptible to more rapid irritation by higher concentrations of ozone, as well as the byproducts of organic molecules it breaks down. This "irritation" has been noted since the earliest applications through to more recent more detailed studies.

The difficulty of targeting ozone to destroy only pathogens in humans and not the surrounding tissue has led non-targeted ozone therapy to fall in to disrepute. The dilemma of weighing the benefits of non-targeted killing pathogens using ozone was recognized since its first therapeutic uses in the 1800s. Attempts have been made to separate out the empirical based ozone therapies from therapies based on a more scientific based understanding of how ozone therapy might work. Despite such attempts there is no indication in the current literature that the controversy will lessen soon as there is a gap in the literature of long-term studies as of 2024.

== Antibiotic action ==
Unlike most disinfectants or antibiotics ozone can kill in both the gaseous or liquid environments. Oxidation of pathogens that leads to their deactivation or destruction by ozone is a complex and varied process. It has been widely investigated, even to the resolution of atomic force microscopy Simply stated, ozone is such a strong oxidizer that, given relatively high concentrations and time, ozone will break apart most structures pathogens rely on to maintain their integrity.

It was observed in 1896 that ozone lessened the fermentation of yeast . In 1897 ozone gas was used as an antiseptic for the first time in a terminal cancer patient. By 1900 ozone was also in use in dentistry and drinking water purification. In 2019 ozone was considered an effective way of killing environmental SARS (COVID19) virus. It was also successfully used to treat COVID-19 patients despite the mechanism of action being poorly understood.

== Specific examples of ozone uses ==
Ozone is used in such a wide variety of circumstances it is impractical to list all the uses. Below are some examples from research articles.

=== Health ===
- Treat laundry wastewater in large facilities such as hospitals, laundries and care homes. Particularly the removal of drugs.
- Part of the alternative strategies used to mitigate antibiotic resistance.
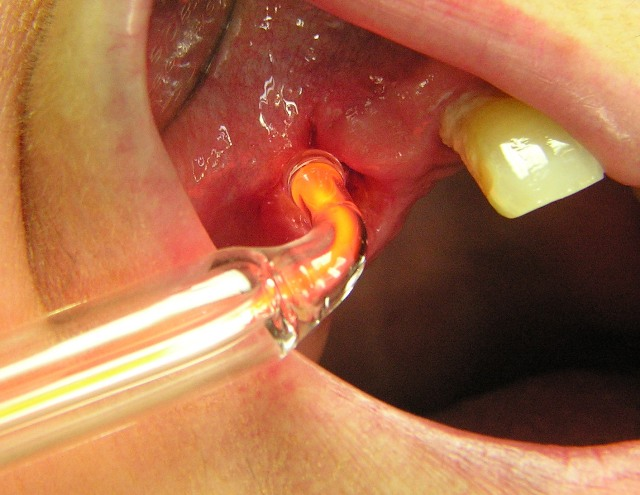
- Ozone for dental application
  In dentistry as and antimicrobial agent and therapies including implantology, oral surgery, periodontology, oral medicine and the treatment of caries. Ozone is used mainly in private dental practices and is open to poor implementation as the mechanism of action is not well enough understood to routinely use.

=== Food ===
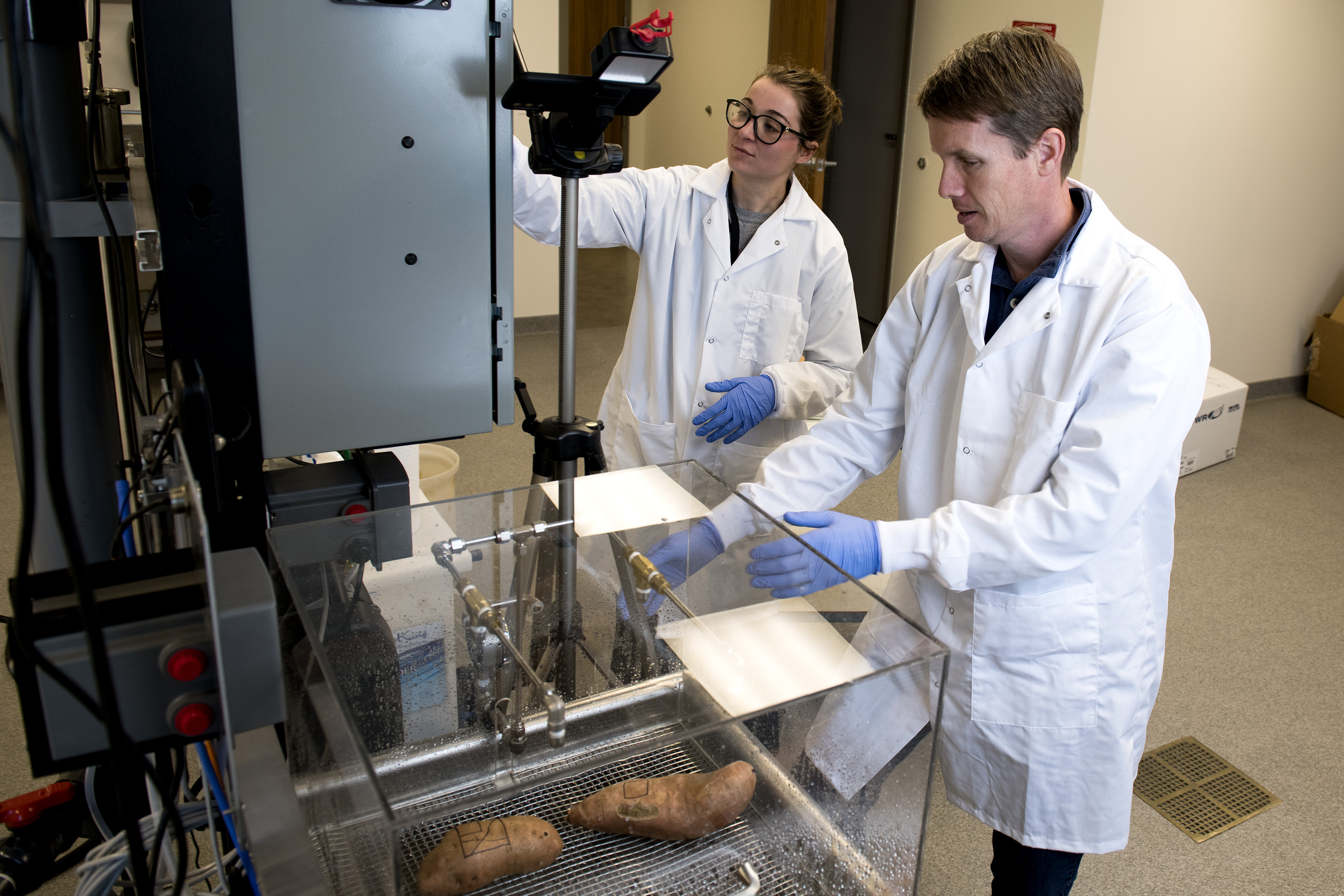
Team testing the effectiveness of ozone-based sanitizing of foods.

- Kill pathogens on and enhance preservation of food.
- Dairy supply chain eco friendly alternatives Due to increased anti-biotic resistance there are attempts to establish ozone as a treatment for mastitis in cows
- Drinking water treatment for more than 100 years. More recently for antibiotic and arsenic removal.

=== Commercial ===
- Deodorize air and objects.

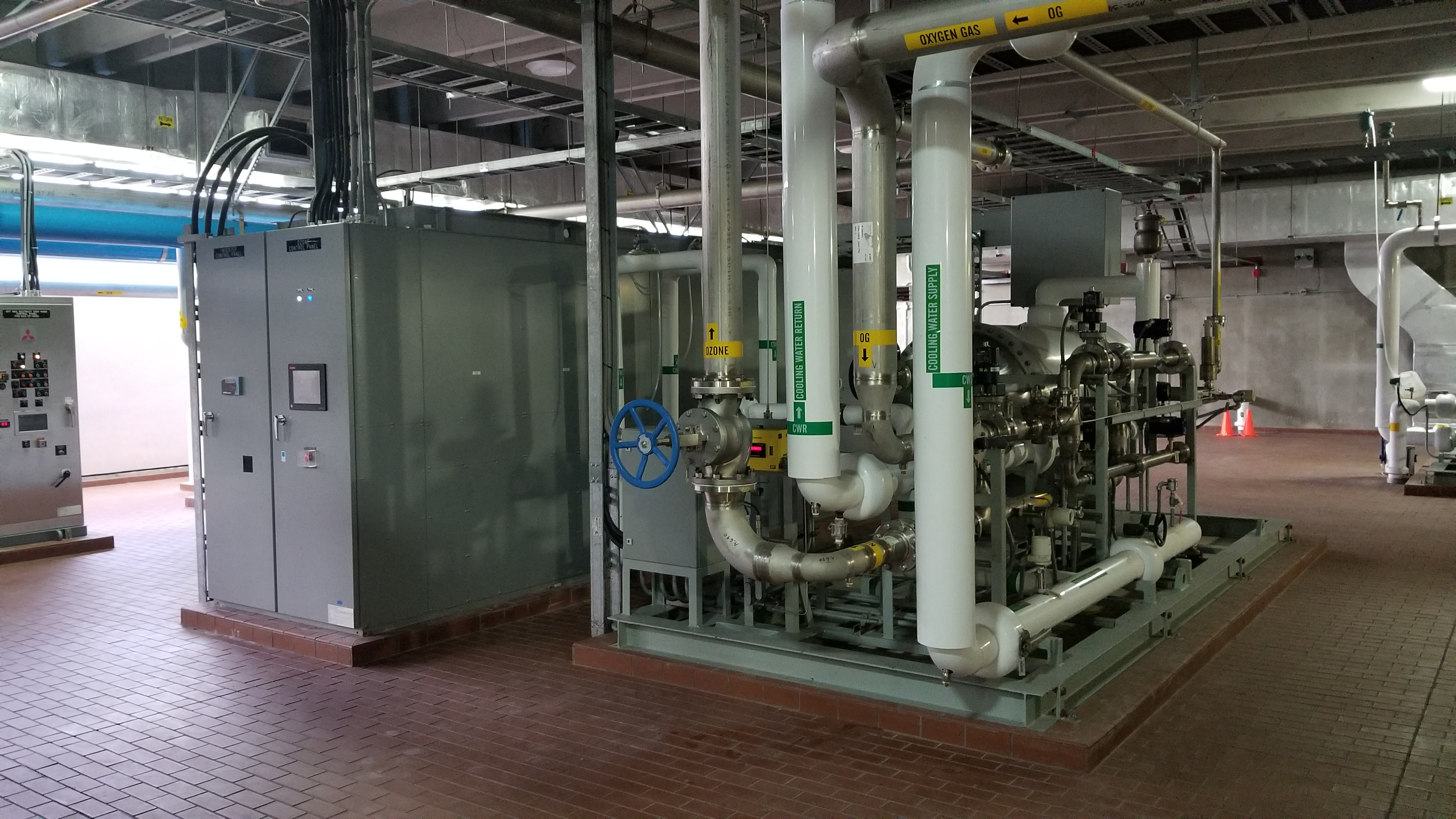
Ozone generation unit at a drinking water treatment plant

- Pool water treatment
- Water reclamation. With scalability problems being addressed.
- Part of the solution for the removal of a range of environmental contaminants from water.
- Chemical and drug synthesis.
