= Optofluidics =

Optofluidics is a research and technology area that combines the advantages of fluidics (in particular microfluidics) and optics. Applications of the technology include displays, biosensors, lab-on-chip devices, lenses, and molecular imaging tools and energy.

== History ==
The idea of fluid-optical devices can be traced back at least as far as the 18th century, when spinning pools of mercury were proposed (and eventually developed) as liquid-mirror telescopes. In the 20th century new technologies such as dye lasers and liquid-core waveguides were developed that took advantage of the tunability and physical adaptability that liquids provided to these newly emerging photonic systems. The field of optofluidics formally began to emerge in the mid-2000s as the fields of microfluidics and nanophotonics were maturing and researchers began to look for synergies between these two areas. One of the primary applications of the field is for lab-on-a-chip and biophotonic products.

== Companies and technology transfer ==
Optofluidic and related research has led to the formation of a number of new products and start-up companies. Varioptic specializes in the development of electrowetting based lenses for numerous applications. Optofluidics, Inc. was launched in 2011 from Cornell University in order to develop tools for molecular trapping and disease diagnosis based on photonic resonator technology. Liquilume from UC Santa Cruz specializes in molecular diagnostics based on arrow waveguides.

In 2012, the European Commission has launched a new COST framework that is concerned solely with optofluidic technology and their application.

== Examples of specific applications ==
Given the broad range of technologies that have already been developed in the field of microfluidics and the many potential applications of integrating optical components into these systems, the range of applications for optofluidic technology is vast.

=== Laminar flow-based optofluidic waveguides ===
Optofluidic waveguides are based on principles of traditional optical waveguides and microfluidic techniques used to maintain gradients or boundaries between flowing fluids. Yang et al. used microfluidic techniques based on laminar flow to generate fluid-based gradient-indices of refraction. This was implemented by flowing two cladding layers of deionized water ($n = 1.33$) around a core layer of ethylene glycol ($n = 1.43$). Using traditional microfluidic techniques to generate and maintain gradients of fluids, Yang et al. were able maintain refractive index profiles ranging from step-index profiles to depth-varying gradient-index profiles. This allowed for the novel and dynamic generation of complex waveguides.

=== Optofluidic photonic crystal fibers ===
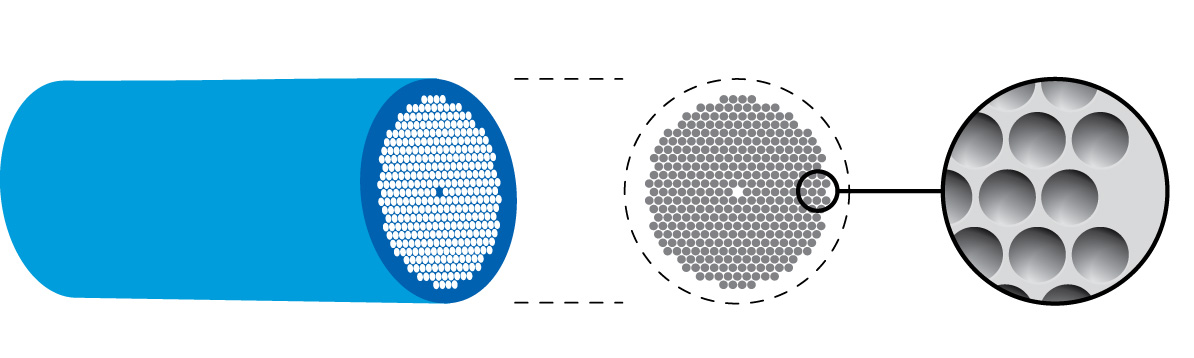
Traditional, hollow photonic crystal fiber

Optofluidic Photonic-crystal fibers (PCFs) are traditional PFCs modified with microfluidic techniques. Photonic-crystal fibers are a type of fiber optic waveguide with cladding layers arranged in a crystalline fashion in their cross-sectional areas. Traditionally, these structured cladding layers are filled with a solid-state material with a different refractive indices or are hollow. Each cladded core then acts as a single mode fiber passing multiple light paths in parallel. Traditional PCFs are also limited to using hollow or solid-state cores that must be filled at the time of construction. This means that the material properties the PCFs were set at the time of construction and were limited to the material properties of solid-state materials.

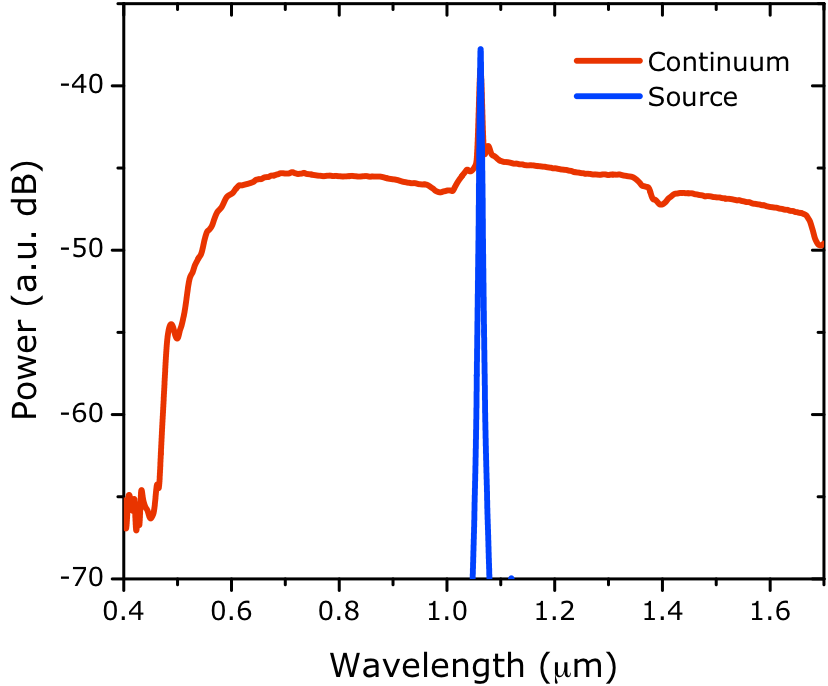
Example of how a photonic-crystal fiber can be used to generate a spectral supercontinuum from a narrowband source.

Viewig et al. used microfluidic technology to selectively fill sections of photonic crystal fibers with fluids that exhibit a high degree of Kerr nonlinearity such as toluene and carbon tetrachloride. Selectively filling hollow PFCs with fluid allows for control over thermal diffusion via spatial segregation and allows for the ability to pattern multiple different types of fluid. Using non-linear fluids, Vieweg et al. were able to generate a soliton continuum which has many applications for imaging and communications.

=== Bubble laser ===
A bubble laser can be created by add laser dye and smectic liquid crystal to soapy water and producing foam. The resulting optical cavity varies in resonant frequency depending on size, air pressure, and electric fields.

== See also ==
- List of optofluidics researchers
