= Bubble laser =

Laser made of a bubble

An ordinary bubble can serve as an optofluidic laser. These bubble lasers have been made of dye-doped soap solutions and smectic liquid crystal. In a bubble laser, the bubble itself serves as the optical resonator. Uniquely, bubble lasers exhibit hundreds of regularly spaced resonant frequencies called whispering gallery modes, named for the Whispering Gallery in St. Paul's Cathedral in London. Researchers have found that the emission spectrum of a bubble laser is highly dependent on the bubble's environment; changing ambient air pressure or electric fields changes the size of the bubble (the optical resonator), and therefore the wavelengths of laser emission.

== Description ==
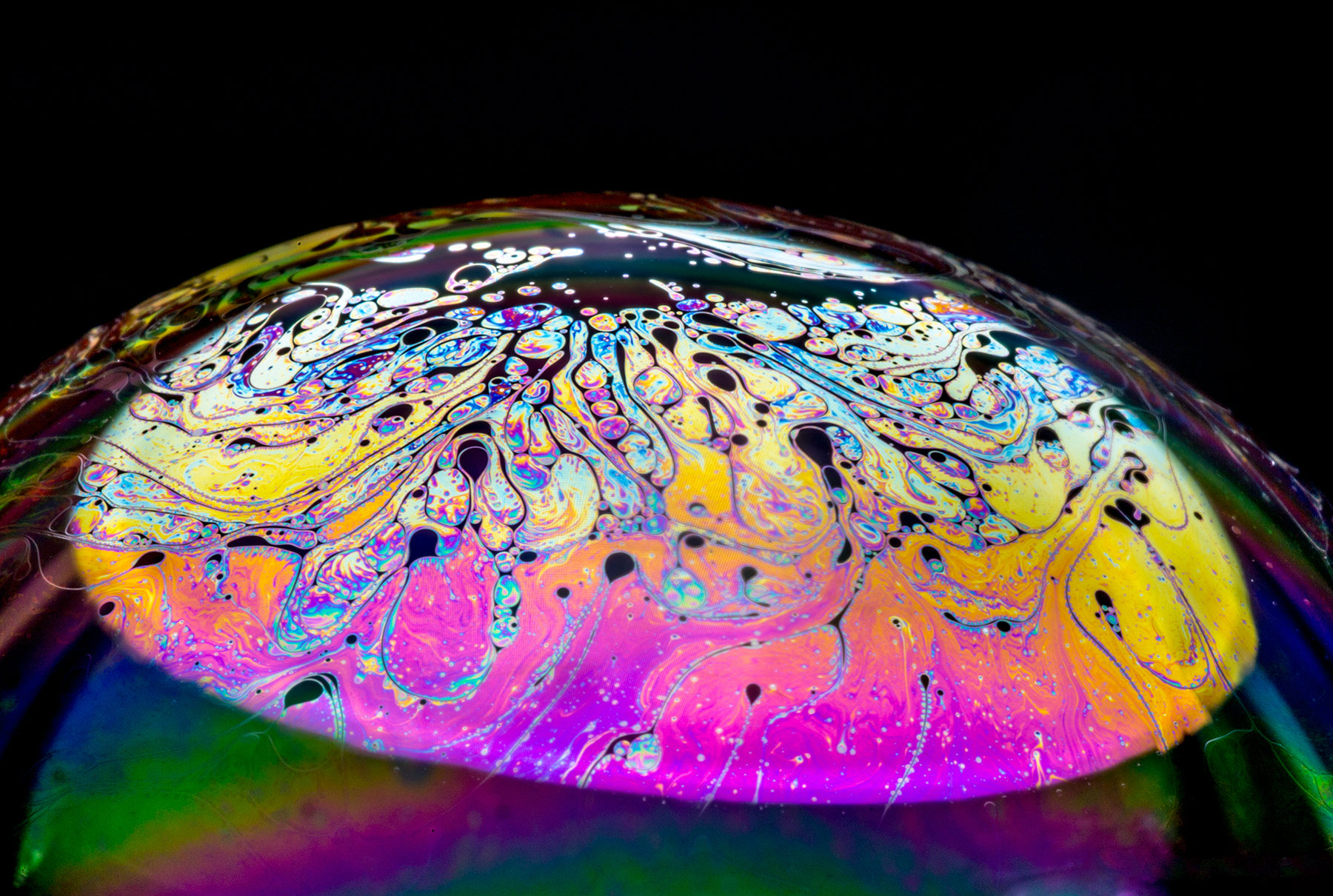
In a soap bubble, thin-film interference and constant thickness variations produces swirling iridescence. Likewise, thickness variations in bubble lasers contribute to an unstable frequency spectrum, prompting scientists to look for alternative bubble liquids.

Bubble lasers have been made from soap solutions to which a few drops of fluorescent laser dye have been added. The fluorescent dye acts as the gain medium. When a pump laser is shone onto the bubble, the dye molecules are excited. The excited dye molecules emit photons. The light propagates along the surface of the soap bubble, leading to wave interference that generates distinct, evenly-spaced optical resonances of the bubble (called whispering gallery modes). When photons, by chance, of the right frequencies are emitted into the whispering gallery modes, it stimulates other molecules to emit more matching photons, amplifying the light.

A soap bubble's thickness is constantly changing due to freely flowing water inside the bubble. This results in an unstable lasing spectrum. More stable results were achieved when the bubbles were made of smectic liquid crystal, which is made entirely of organic liquid-crystal molecules. These bubbles do not contain water, can be very thin, and can survive almost indefinitely.

== Applications ==
The spacing of whispering gallery modes is directly related to the bubble's circumference. This means that bubble lasers may be used as pressure sensors. Bubble lasers have measured pressure changes as high as 100 bar (10,000 kPA) and as low as 1.5 Pa, an "exceptionally large" dynamic range, far outperforming other pressure sensors of comparable size.

In the future, bubble lasers may be used to study thin films and phenomena such as Cavity optomechanics.

== See also ==
- List of laser articles
- Sonoluminescence – Light emissions from collapsing, sound-induced bubbles
