= Bubble (physics) =

Globule of one substance in another, typically gas in a liquid

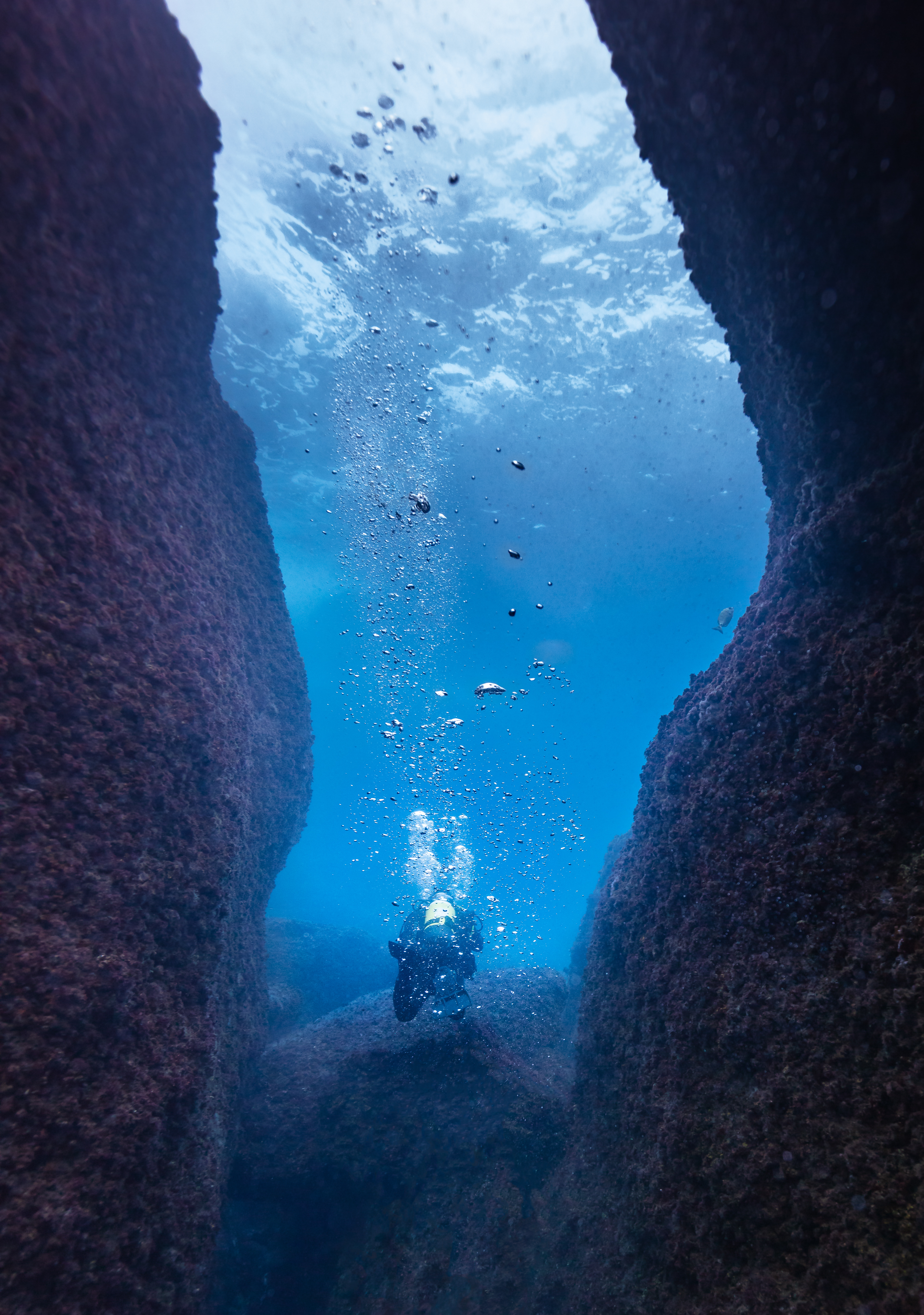
Air bubbles rising from a scuba diver in water

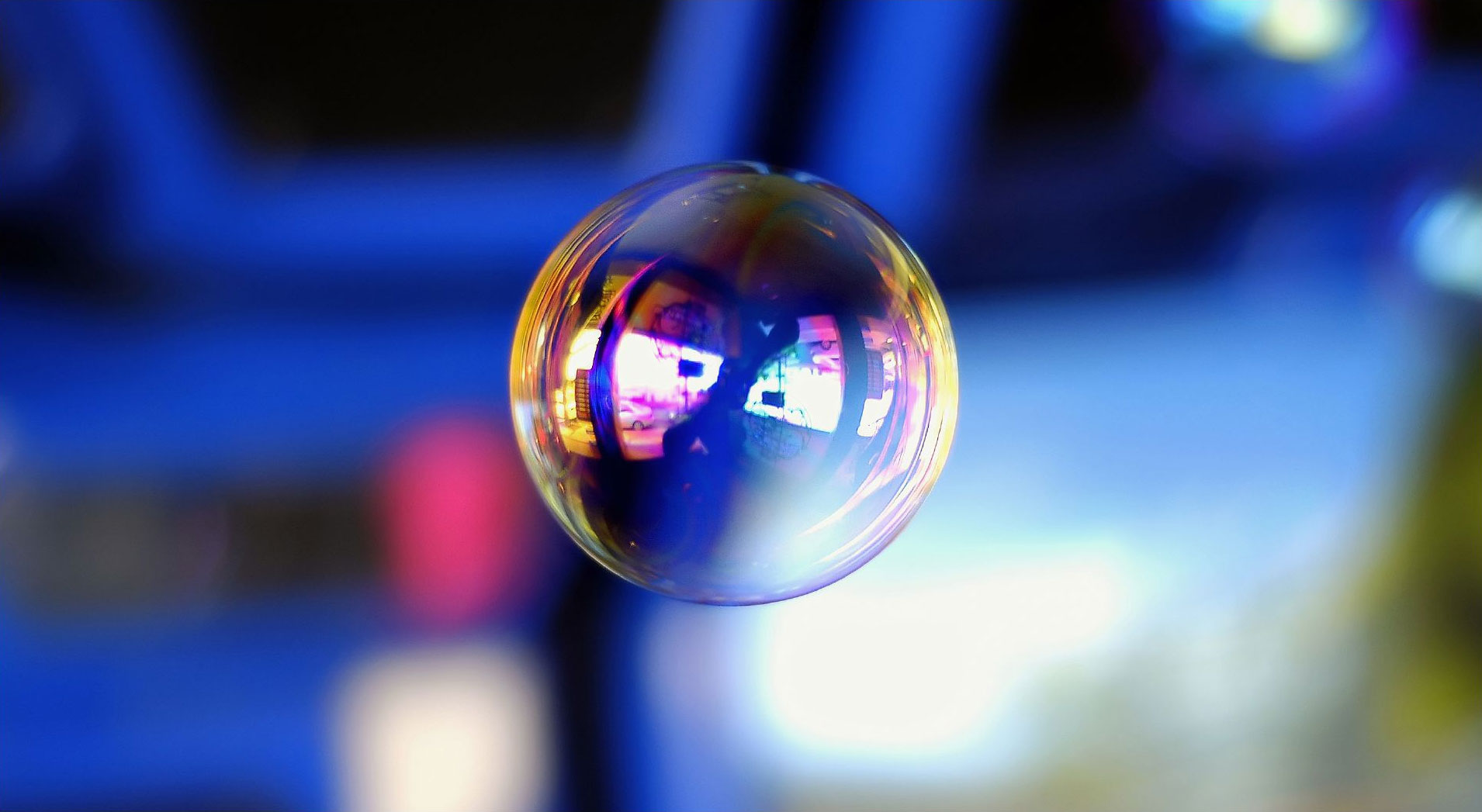
A soap bubble floating in the air

A bubble is a globule of a gas substance in a liquid. In the opposite case, a globule of a liquid in a gas, is called a drop. Due to the Marangoni effect, bubbles may remain intact when they reach the surface of the immersive substance.

== Common examples ==
Bubbles are seen in many places in everyday life, for example:

- As spontaneous nucleation of supersaturated carbon dioxide in soft drinks
- As vapor in boiling water
- As air mixed into agitated water, such as below a waterfall
- As sea foam
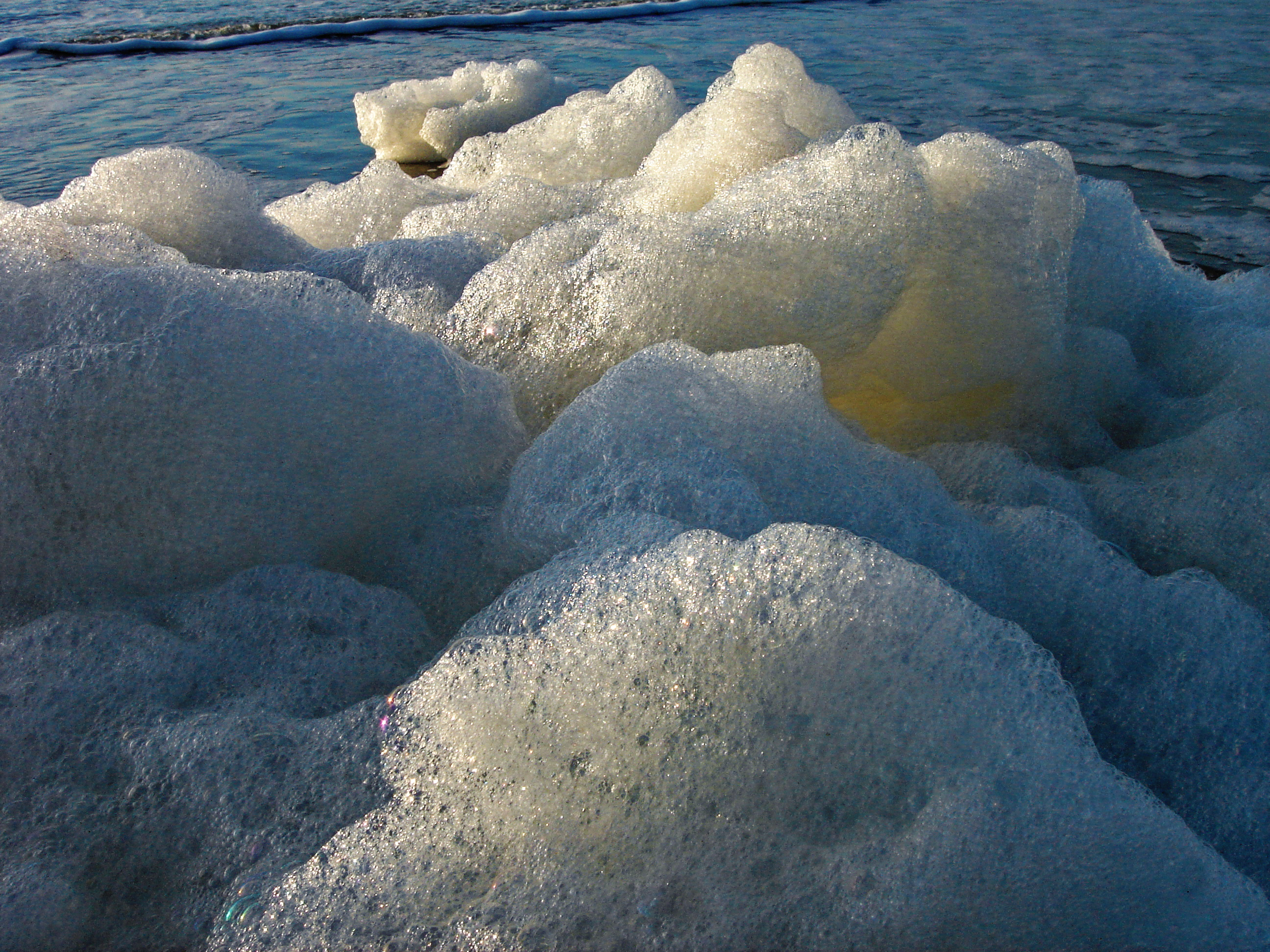
  Sea foam on the shore
- As a soap bubble
- As given off in chemical reactions, e.g., baking soda + vinegar
- As a gas trapped in glass during its manufacture
- As the indicator in a spirit level
- As bubble gum

== Physics and chemistry ==
Bubbles form and coalesce into globular shapes because those shapes are at a lower energy state. For the physics and chemistry behind it, see nucleation.

=== Appearance ===
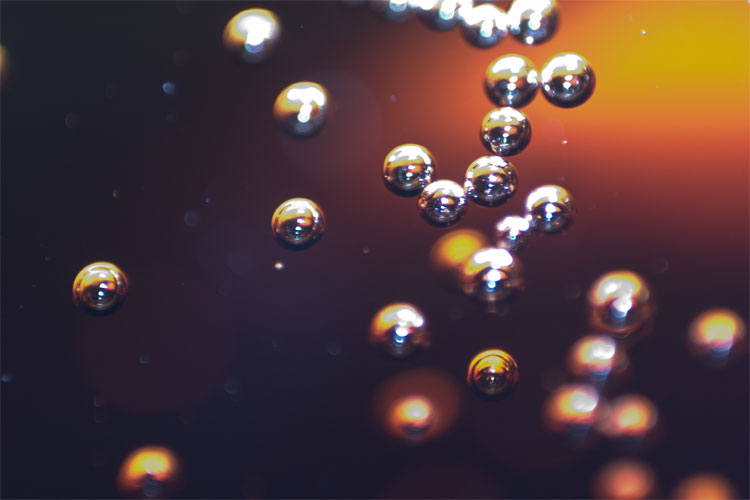
Bubbles of gas rising in a soft drink

Bubbles are visible because they have a different refractive index (RI) than the surrounding substance. For example, the RI of air is approximately 1.0003 and the RI of water is approximately 1.333. Snell's Law describes how electromagnetic waves change direction at the interface between two mediums with different RI; thus bubbles can be identified from the accompanying refraction and internal reflection even though both the immersed and immersing mediums are transparent.

The above explanation only holds for bubbles of one medium submerged in another medium (e.g. bubbles of gas in a soft drink); the volume of a membrane bubble (e.g. soap bubble) will not distort light very much, and one can only see a membrane bubble due to thin-film diffraction and reflection.

=== Applications ===
Nucleation can be intentionally induced, for example, to create a bubblegram in a solid.

In medical ultrasound imaging, small, encapsulated bubbles called contrast agent are used to enhance the contrast.

In thermal inkjet printing, vapor bubbles are used as actuators. They are occasionally used in other microfluidics applications as actuators.

The violent collapse of bubbles (cavitation) near solid surfaces and the resulting impinging jet constitute the mechanism used in ultrasonic cleaning. The same effect, but on a larger scale, is used in focused energy weapons such as the bazooka and the torpedo. Pistol shrimp also uses a collapsing cavitation bubble as a weapon. The same effect is used to treat kidney stones in a lithotripter. Marine mammals such as dolphins and whales use bubbles for entertainment or as hunting tools. Aerators cause the dissolution of gas in the liquid by injecting bubbles.

Bubbles are used by chemical and metallurgical engineers in processes such as distillation, absorption, flotation and spray drying. The complex processes involved often require consideration for mass and heat transfer and are modeled using fluid dynamics.

The star-nosed mole and the American water shrew can smell underwater by rapidly breathing through their nostrils and creating a bubble.

Research on the origin of life on Earth suggests that bubbles may have played an integral role in confining and concentrating precursor molecules for life, a function currently performed by cell membranes.

Bubble lasers use bubbles as the optical resonator. They can be used as highly sensitive pressure sensors.

=== Pulsation ===
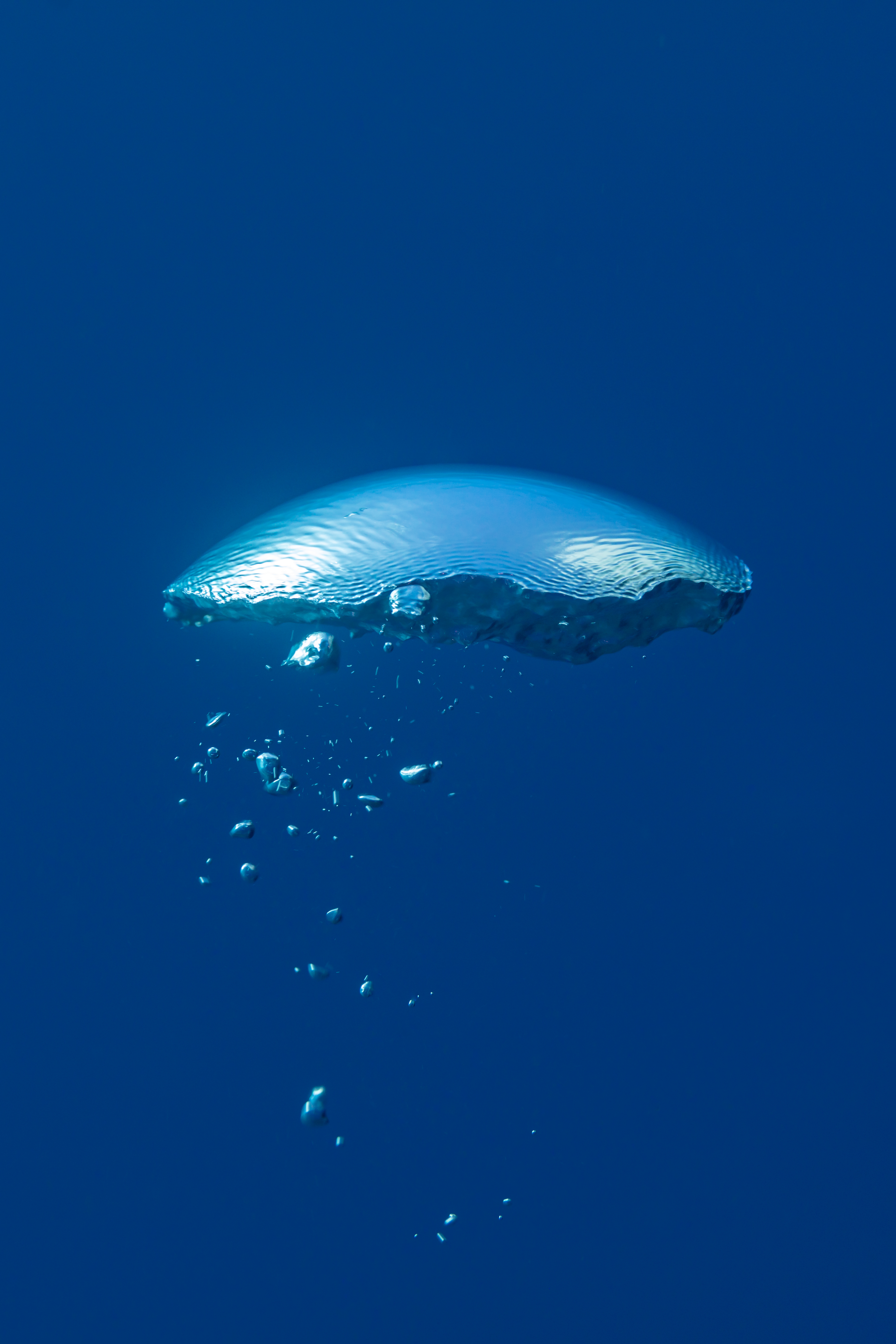
Air bubble with ripples, rising in water

When bubbles are disturbed (for example when a gas bubble is injected underwater), the wall oscillates. Although it is often visually masked by much larger deformations in shape, a component of the oscillation changes the bubble volume (i.e. it is pulsation) which, in the absence of an externally-imposed sound field, occurs at the bubble's natural frequency. The pulsation is the most important component of the oscillation, acoustically, because by changing the gas volume, it changes its pressure, and leads to the emission of sound at the bubble's natural frequency. For air bubbles in water, large bubbles (negligible surface tension and thermal conductivity) undergo adiabatic pulsations, which means that no heat is transferred either from the liquid to the gas or vice versa. The natural frequency of such bubbles is determined by the equation:

$$f_0 = {1 \over 2 \pi R_0}\sqrt{3 \gamma p_0 \over \rho}$$

where:

- $\gamma$ is the specific heat ratio of the gas
- $R_0$ is the steady state radius
- $p_0$ is the steady state pressure
- $\rho$ is the mass density of the surrounding liquid

For air bubbles in water, smaller bubbles undergo isothermal pulsations. The corresponding equation for small bubbles of surface tension σ (and negligible liquid viscosity) is

$$f_0 = {1 \over 2 \pi R_0}\sqrt{{3 p_0 \over \rho}+{4 \sigma \over \rho R_0}}$$

Excited bubbles trapped underwater are the major source of liquid sounds, such as inside our knuckles during knuckle cracking, and when a rain droplet impacts a surface of water.

== Physiology and medicine ==
Injury by bubble formation and growth in body tissues is the mechanism of decompression sickness, which occurs when supersaturated dissolved inert gases leave the solution as bubbles during decompression. The damage can be due to mechanical deformation of tissues due to bubble growth in situ, or by blocking blood vessels where the bubble has lodged.

Arterial gas embolism can occur when a gas bubble is introduced to the circulatory system and lodges in a blood vessel that is too small for it to pass through under the available pressure difference. This can occur as a result of decompression after hyperbaric exposure, a lung overexpansion injury, during intravenous fluid administration, or during surgery.

== In foods ==
Foods containing bubbles includes bread, cakes, cereals and chocolate, and drinks including beer, champagne, mineral water and soft drinks, as well as more experimental applications in foams as made by chefs.

== See also ==
- Antibubble – Droplet of liquid surrounded by a thin film of gas
- Bubble fusion – Nuclear fusion reaction
- Bubble sensor – Device to detect bubbles in liquid-filled tubes
- Foam – Form of matter
- Minnaert resonance – Sound of a drop of water falling into water
- Nanobubble – Sub-micrometer gas-containing cavity, or bubble, in aqueous solutions
- Sonoluminescence – Luminescence induced by sound waves
- Underwater acoustics – Study of the propagation of sound in water

== Sources ==
- Pugh, RJ; Hamlett, CAE; Fairhurst, DJ (April 2023). "A short overview of bubbles in foods and chocolate". Advances in Colloid and Interface Science. 314 102835. doi:10.1016/j.cis.2023.102835. PMID 36958180.
