= Bubble sensor =

Device to detect bubbles in liquid-filled tubes

Bubble sensors are used to detect the presence of bubbles in fluid-filled tubes. They play a vital role in many fields, including medical technology, process control, pharmaceuticals, and the petroleum industry. The most common type of sensors used are ultrasonic or capacitor based.

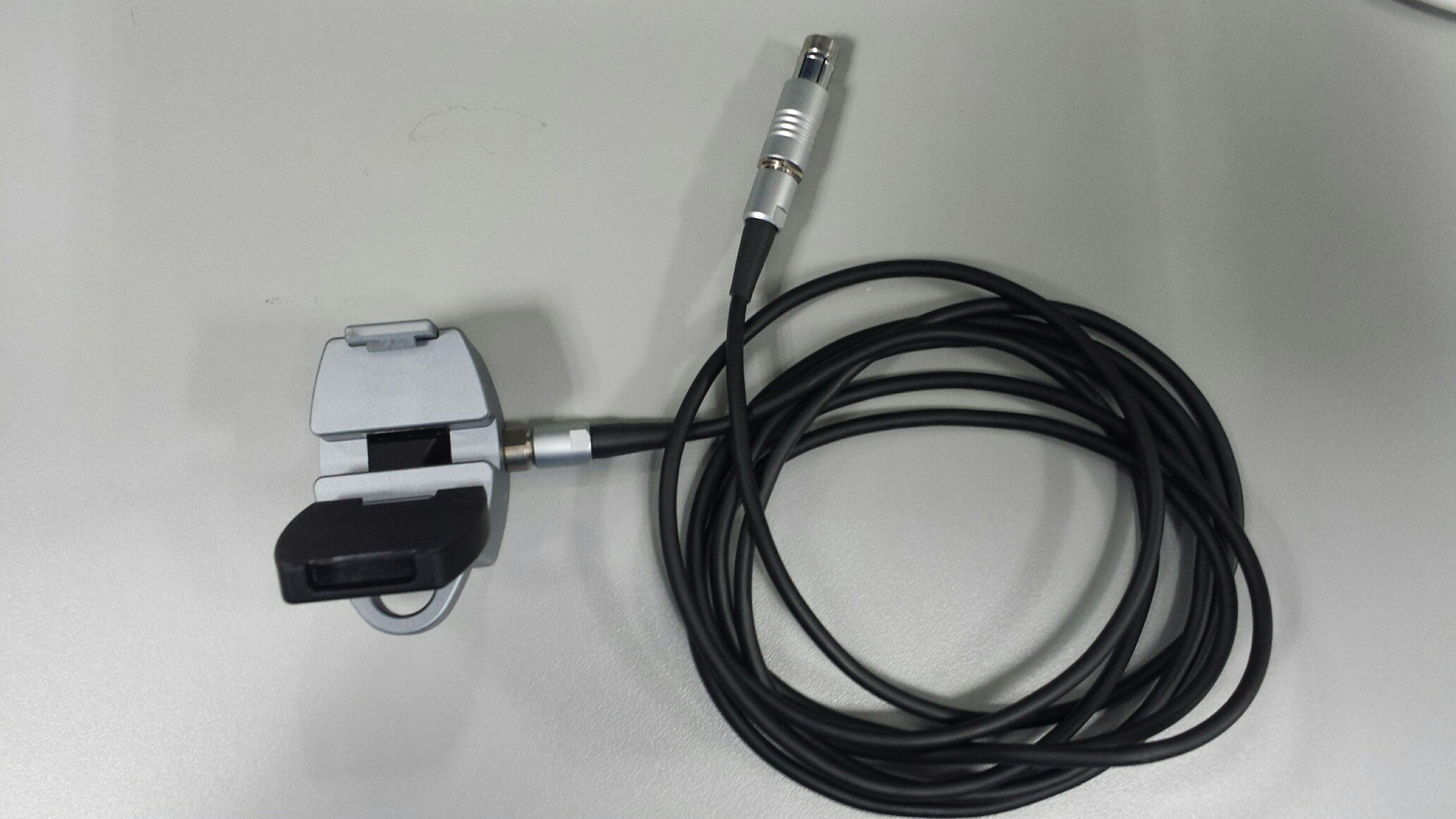
Bubble sensor for Extracorporeal Blood Circuits

== Ultrasonic sensors ==
Ultrasonic sensors use two techniques to detect bubbles, one method involves transmitting sound waves from a transducer through the fluid to a second transducer that detects the waves. A second method involves pulse-echo, sound waves are transmitted to the fluid, reflected and received by the same transmitter that sent it. In both of these methods bubbles will have an effect on the velocity, attenuation and the scattering of the sound, thus they are easily detected.

== Capacitive sensors ==
Due to their ease of fabrication and minimization capability, Capacitive sensors have found uses in a number of industries and can be efficiently designed on a printed circuit board. A capacitor consist of two parallel electrodes with a capacitance computed as,

C =εA/d (1)

Where ε is the permittivity of the dielectric medium, A is the cross sectional area of the electrodes and d is the distance between them. Liquids have a higher dielectric constant than gas; when an air bubble is in a fluid-filled tube the capacitance is reduced and the output voltage rises. The size of the bubble is inversely related to the measured capacitance. Table 1 shows an example of the characteristics of a particular capacitive sensor being researched.

Capacitance (nF)	Air Bubble Diameter (mm)	Output Voltage (mV)
43.50	0	18.60
42.63	0.82	20.30
42.54	1.00	22.01
41.07	2.97	40.50
40.44	3.55	43.70
39.38	4.00	47.90

Table 1 Example Characteristics of a Particular Capacitive Sensor

== Uses in extracorporeal blood circuits ==
In various medical treatments that use Extracorporeal Blood Circuits (ECBC) the detection of air bubbles in the blood is vital for the patient safety. An air bubble in an artery that supplies blood to the heart or brain can cause serious injury or death. In an ECBC the bubble sensor is placed on the arterial pump that is supplying the blood to the heart. Depending on the size of the bubble detected the pump will respond in different ways. The sensors allow the operator to set a size threshold for the size of the bubbles to detect. If the bubbles are below the threshold it is displayed to the user as microbubble activity. When a bubble equal to or greater than the threshold is detected an audio and visual alarm is generated and the arterial pump is stopped, this effectively terminates the cardiopulmonary bypass. The operator must identify and remove the bubble before bypass can be re-instated.
