= Nicole Hashemi =

Iranian–American engineer

- Born: Tehran, Iran

Academic background
- Education: BSc, mechanical engineering, Amirkabir University of Technology; MS, mechanical engineering, West Virginia University; Ph.D. mechanical engineering, Virginia Tech

Academic work
- Institutions: Iowa State University

Nicole Nastaran Hashemi is an American engineer. As an associate professor at Iowa State University, Hashemi was elected a Fellow of the Royal Society of Chemistry and American Society of Mechanical Engineers.

== Early life and education ==
Growing up in Tehran, Iran, Hashemi attended Tehran Farzanegan School. She completed her Bachelor of Science degree in mechanical engineering from Amirkabir University of Technology before moving to the United States for her Master's degree in mechanical engineering from West Virginia University and Ph.D. in mechanical engineering from Virginia Tech.

== Career ==
Upon completing her formal education, Hashemi accepted a position at the Naval Research Lab in Washington, D.C. At the lab, she developed a microflow cytometer to detect and analyze phytoplankton. She remained at the lab until 2011 when she joined the faculty at Iowa State University as the William March Scholar in Mechanical Engineering. The following year, her paper Optofluidic characterization of marine algae using a microflow cytometer was the recipient of the 2011 Naval Research Laboratory NRC/ASEE Research Publication Award. Hashemi was also named to the American Society for Engineering Education’s Virtual Communities of Practice to develop research-based instructional practices and classroom teaching skills. She was also the National Academy of Sciences' Kavli Invitee for 2013.

As an assistant professor in mechanical engineering, Hashemi oversaw a team producing microfibers with the help of microfluidics to design and fabricate fibers for single-cell studies and tissue engineering. The project was funded by a two-year, $202,000 grant from the Office of Naval Research, the Iowa State Presidential Initiative for Interdisciplinary Research, and the U.S. Army Medical Research and Materiel Command. The following year, Hashemi was the recipient of the College of Engineering’s 2017 Early Career Engineering Faculty Research Award. She earned the award "in recognition of superior, early achievements in research by young engineering faculty members as evidenced by demonstrated ability to conduct original research, by scholarly contributions to the literature, and by the introduction of new and/or improved laboratory techniques and instrumentation."

Following her promotion to the rank of associate professor, Hashemi was selected to attend National Academy of Engineering 24th annual U.S. Frontiers of Engineering Symposium. In 2019, Hashemi and a research team began using a "placenta-on-a-chip" to study the transport of caffeine molecules from a mother to a fetus. In March 2021, Hashemi was elected a Fellow of the American Society of Mechanical Engineers for both her research and teaching/mentoring contributions. The following month, Hashemi was elected a Fellow of the Royal Society of Chemistry for her work on microfluidic devices, Organ-on-a-Chip Technology, conductive graphene matrix-encapsulated cells.
