= Nanobubble =

Sub-micrometer gas-containing cavity, or bubble, in aqueous solutions

A nanobubble is a small sub-micrometer gas-containing cavity, or bubble, in aqueous solutions with unique properties caused by high internal pressure, small size and surface charge. The diameter of a nanobubble is generally in a range between 70 and 500 nanometers. They are known for their longevity and stability, low buoyancy, negative surface charge, high surface area per volume, high internal pressure, and high gas transfer rates.

Nanobubbles can be formed by injecting any gas into a liquid. Because of their unique properties, they can interact with and affect physical, chemical, and biological processes. They have been used in technology applications for industries such as wastewater, environmental engineering, agriculture, aquaculture, medicine and biomedicine, and others.

== Background ==
Nanobubbles are nanoscopic and generally too small to be observed using the naked eye or a standard microscope, but can be observed using backscattering of light using tools such as green laser pointers. Stable nanobubbles in bulk about 30-400 nanometers in diameter were first reported in the British scientific journal Nature in 1982. Scientists found them in deep water breaks using sonar observation.

In 1994, a study by Phil Attard, John L. Parker, and Per M. Claesson further theorized about the existence of nano-sized bubbles, proposing that stable nanobubbles can form on the surface of both hydrophilic and hydrophobic surfaces depending on factors such as the level of saturation and surface tension.

Nanobubbles can be generated using techniques such as hydrodynamic cavitation, solvent exchange, electrochemical reactions, and immersing a hydrophobic substrate into water while increasing or decreasing the water's temperature.

Nanobubbles and nanoparticles are often found together in certain circumstances, but they differ in that nanoparticles have different properties such as density and resonance frequency.

The study of nanobubbles faces challenges in understanding their stability and the mechanisms behind their formation and dissolution.

== Theory ==
There is a theory that explains existence of the stable nanobubbles. The interaction between structured interfacial water layer and electric double layer (EDL) is responsible for this stability.

The hypothesis of water molecules structuring at hydrophobic interfaces exists for more than century with dozens of papers published on this subject, some of them reviewed in the book. It was confirmed with several measuring techniques: Atomic force microscopy, Sum frequency generation spectroscopy, Raman spectroscopy, Ultrasound.

There are also many studies revealing electric charges on the nanobubbles interfaces leading to formation of electric double layer characterized with certain zeta potential (ζ), for instance the paper by Meegoda et al. Some of these studies established correlation between bubble diameter and zeta potential, as shown in Figure on the right. Experimental data is from the said Meegoda et all study, whereas the red line represents result of theory.

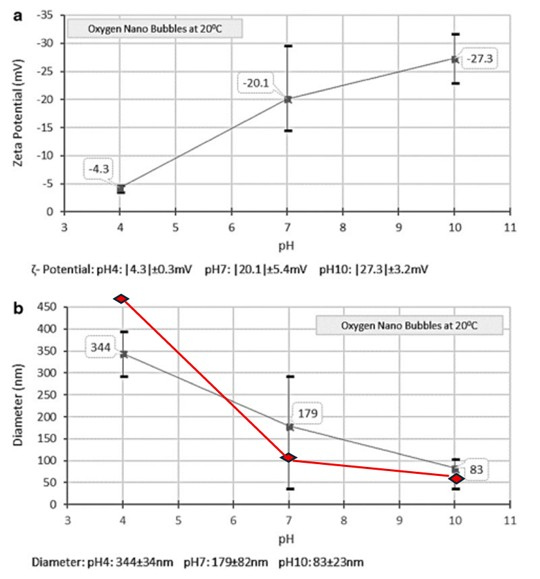

Individually, neither of these interfacial layers can explain nanobubbles longevity. However, their interaction can, as it is shown in the paper. This interaction leads to the two new surface forces.

The electric field of EDL exerts a normal force on the oriented water molecules dipole moments. The name dielectrostatic was assigned to this force. It compensates for the other normal force caused by Young-Laplace excessive pressure in the bubble. Balance of these two normal forces determines size of the stable nanobubble a_{s} according to the following equation:

$$\ a_s = \frac{2\gamma}{MLNd_w\zeta\kappa^2}$$

where M=55500 is number of moles of water in 1 m^{3}, N is Avogadro number, d_{w} is dipole moment of the water molecule, ζ is zeta potential of the bubble, κ is reciprocal Debye length. Parameter L is a thickness of the structured water layer. It equals approximately 0.24 nm for monolayer. Assumption of two layers of the structured water molecules leads to the nanobubble stable size versus zeta potential that is very close to experimental data, as shown on the Figure above as a red line. This can be considered as an experimental support of this theory. There is one more experimental fact supporting validity of this theory. The nanobubble size is reciprocal proportional to zeta potential according to the Figure above. The same dependence is predicted by the theory according to the equation for the stable nanobubble size.

The tangential force balance is achieved due to the additional tangential surface force - the repulsion of the oriented water molecules dipole moments. It competes with the classical surface tension. Its contribution to the total surface tension γ_{s} is given by following equation.

$${\gamma_s} = \frac{2d_w}{\pi\varepsilon\varepsilon_0 L_d^5}$$

where ε and ε_{0} are dielectric constants of the liquid and vacuum, L_{d} is the distance between dipoles in the structured layer. It was shown in the paper that this new surface force is sufficient for compensating the classical surface tension if distance between dipoles is 0.23 nm. This seems realist number taking into account that the distant between water molecules in the bulk is 0.3 nm and the dipoles are compressed towards each other with the classical surface tension.

=== Experimental evidence supporting the theory ===
1. Experimentally measured nanobubbles sizes agree with theoretically predicted ones;
2. Experimentally observed reciprocally linear relationship between nanobubbles size and zeta potential agrees with theoretical prediction;
3. Nanobubbles created in liquids having lower polarity than water are much less stable and larger, which supports critical role of the liquid molecules dipole moments.

== Properties ==
Nanobubbles possess several distinct properties:

- Stability: Nanobubbles are more stable than larger bubbles due to factors such as surface charge and contaminants that reduce interfacial tension, allowing them to remain in liquids for extended periods.
- High internal pressure: The small size of nanobubbles leads to high internal pressure, which influences their behavior and interactions with the surrounding liquid.
- Large surface-to-volume ratio: This property is crucial for efficient gas transfer between the nanobubbles and the liquid, which is beneficial for various applications.

== Applications ==
In aquaculture, nanobubbles have been used to improve fish health and growth rates and to enhance oxidation. Nanobubbles can improve health outcomes for fish by increasing the dissolved oxygen concentration of water, reducing the concentration of bacteria and viruses in water, and triggering the nonspecific defense system of species such as the Nile tilapia, improving survivability during bacterial infections. The use of nanobubbles to increase dissolved oxygen levels can also promote plant growth and reduce the need for chemicals. Nanobubbles have also been shown as effective in increasing the metabolism of living organisms including plants. In regards to oxidation, nanobubbles are known for generating reactive oxygen species, giving them oxidative properties exceeding hydrogen peroxide. Researchers have also proposed nanobubbles as a low-chemical alternative to chemical-based oxidants such as chlorine and ozone.

=== Water and wastewater treatment ===
Nanobubbles have been investigated as an aeration technology for water and wastewater treatment, where their high gas-transfer efficiency and long residence time can improve oxygen utilization compared with conventional diffused aeration. Bulk nanobubbles have been shown to enhance the removal of organic pollutants through reactive oxygen species generation, and ozone nanobubbles in particular have been used for disinfection and the oxidation of recalcitrant organics.

=== Mineral processing and flotation ===
In mineral processing, nanobubbles can act as secondary collectors that attach to hydrophobic particle surfaces and reduce the induction time for bubble–particle attachment during froth flotation. Laboratory and pilot studies have reported recovery improvements for fine and ultrafine mineral particles when nanobubbles are introduced alongside conventional flotation bubbles.

=== Surface cleaning ===
Nanobubble-containing water has been studied for surface cleaning and defouling applications, including membrane fouling mitigation and the removal of biofilms from solid surfaces. The collapse of microbubbles in the surrounding nanobubble suspension can locally generate hydroxyl radicals and shear forces that disrupt adhered contaminants.
